The 1919 New Year Honours were appointments by King George V to various orders and honours to reward and highlight good works by citizens of the British Empire. The appointments were published in The London Gazette and The Times in January 1919.

Military Division

Royal Navy
Engineer Lieutenant-Commander Henry Charles Anstey 
Lieutenant-Commander Harold Gordon Atkinson, Royal Naval Volunteer Reserve
Lieutenant William Atkinson, Royal Naval Reserve
Commander Arthur Douglas Barff 
Lieutenant John Holderness Bartlett, Royal Naval Reserve
Surgeon Commander Richard Francis Bate 
Lieutenant-Commander Henry Baynham 
Paymaster Lieutenant Norman Hugh Beall 
Lieutenant Arthur Bean, Royal Naval Reserve
Commander Edward Morden Bennett 
Paymaster Lieutenant-Commander Martin Gilbert Bennett
Lieutenant Louis Charles Bernacchi, Royal Naval Volunteer Reserve
Lieutenant Commander Frank Birch, Royal Naval Volunteer Reserve
Commander Arthur George Hayes Bond 
Lieutenant Commander Charles Kirby Borissow, Royal Naval Reserve
Lieutenant-Commander Gerald Percival Bowen 
Commander Duncan Tatton Brown 
Paymaster Lieutenant-Commander John Edward Ambrose Brown 
Commander Harold Ernest Browne 
Engineer Lieutenant John Robertson Buchan 
Paymaster Commander Wilfrid James Bull 
Commander Charles Thomas Alexander Bunbury 
Commander Arthur Stanley Burt 
Lieutenant-Colonel James Frederick Cable, Royal Marines
Lieutenant Christopher George Carr, Royal Naval Reserve
Commander James Thomas Walter Charles  Royal Naval Reserve
Engineer Commander James Sandford Constable 
Lieutenant Alexander James Cook, Royal Naval Reserve
Paymaster Lieutenant-Commander Archibald Frederick Cooper 
Acting Lieutenant Frederick James Harold Corbyn, Royal Naval Reserve
Commander William Henry Cottrell  Royal Naval Volunteer Reserve
Lieutenant Herbert Spencer Cox, Royal Naval Reserve
Lieutenant Commander Charles Henry Davey 
Lieutenant-Commander Roderick Wilson Day, Royal Naval Reserve
Lieutenant-Commander Arthur Douglas Harry Dibben 
Engineer Commander Horace Edward Dowling 
Lieutenant Commander Edward Dumerque Drury, Royal Naval Reserve
Lieutenant Robert Ewart Dunn, Royal Naval Reserve
Lieutenant Thomas William John Dunning, Royal Naval Reserve
Lieutenant Thomas Eachus, Royal Naval Volunteer Reserve
Lieutenant Robert Edmond, Royal Naval Volunteer Reserve
Lieutenant Herbert Denham Emery, Royal Naval Volunteer Reserve
Paymaster Lieutenant William George Ewart Enright 
Engineer Commander James Risk Farish, Royal Naval Reserve
Lieutenant-Commander John Phelips Farquharson
Engineer Captain John William Figgins, R.N. HMS Glory 
Commander Thomas Roderick Fforde 
Paymaster Lieutenant Reginald Bertram Ford, Royal Naval Reserve
Engineer Commander Benson Fletcher Freeman 
Captain Henry Vincent Fuller, Royal Marines
Paymaster Lieutenant-Commander John William Edward Gilhespy
Engineer Commander Andrew Gillespie, Royal Naval Reserve
Lieutenant John Gillies, Royal Naval Volunteer Reserve
Lieutenant William Glegg-Smith, Royal Naval Volunteer Reserve
Lieutenant Norris Goddard, Royal Naval Volunteer Reserve Chaplain
Reverend Christopher Graham 
Honorary Engineer Commander William Air Graham, Royal Naval Reserve
Paymaster Lieutenant-Commander Charles Greenwood, Royal Naval Volunteer Reserve
Commander George Gregory  Royal Naval Reserve
Commander Alfred William Gush 
Lieutenant Herbert James Hanson, Royal Naval Volunteer Reserve
Surgeon Commander Robert Hardie 
Lieutenant Commander Edward George Godolphin Hastings
Captain Gerald Fenwick Haszard  Royal Marine Artillery
Paymaster Lieutenant-Commander Robert Haves 
Engineer Lieutenant-Commander Frederick Gambler Haynes  Royal Naval Reserve
Paymaster Lieutenant-Commander Charles Howard Heaton 
Lieutenant Thomas Mann Heddles, Royal Naval Reserve
Engineer Commander Edward Owen Hefford 
Lieutenant Gerald Dudley Hill, Royal Naval Volunteer Reserve
Lieutenant Stephen Leonard Hoare, Royal Naval Reserve
Commander Berkeley Home-Sunnier 
Lieutenant Charles Frederick Horne, Royal Naval Reserve
Lieutenant Henry Mowbray Howard, Royal Naval Volunteer Reserve
Acting Schoolmaster Lieutenant Samuel Louis Hutchings
Surgeon Lieutenant Arthur Ernest Iles 
Lieutenant-Commander Harold Isherwood, Royal Naval Volunteer Reserve
Commander Harold Gordon Jackson 
Lieutenant Commander Thomas Norman Jenkinson, Royal Naval Volunteer Reserve
Paymaster Lieutenant-Commander David T. Jones, Royal Naval Reserve
Major Hubert Louis Jones, Royal Marine Light Infantry
Engineer Commander John Kelly 
Lieutenant C. W. King, Royal Naval Volunteer Reserve
Acting Paymaster Lieutenant Herbert Victor Lee, Royal Naval Reserve
Engineer Commander Arthur Ellis Lester 
Engineer Commander Andrew Graham Liston, Royal Naval Reserve
Lieutenant-Commander Stephen Olive Lyttleton 
Lieutenant Leander McCormick-Goodhart, Royal Naval Volunteer Reserve
Lieutenant Commander Redmond Walter McGrath, Royal Naval Volunteer Reserve
Lieutenant William MacPherson McRitchie, Royal Naval Reserve
Commander Robert Henry Ramsay MacKay 
Lieutenant James Charles Newsome Macmillan 
Commander Frederick William Mace, Royal Naval Reserve
Lieutenant John Martyn, Royal Naval Reserve
Shipwright Lieutenant Commander James Ress May 
Paymaster Commander Grenville Acton Miller 
Lieutenant Joseph Alfred Minter 
Engineer Commander Albert John Campbell Moore 
Commander Hartley Russell Gwennap Moore 
Surgeon Lieutenant-Commander Leslie Miles Morris 
Acting Schoolmaster Lieutenant Richard Mountstephens 
Commander Edwin Mansergh Palmer 
Lieutenant Gladwyn Parry, Royal Naval Reserve
Surgeon Commander Herbert Lloyd Penny 
Commander Herbert Mosley Perfect 
Engineer Lieutenant Cyril Harold Lee Pilditch 
Lieutenant John Maurice Barbes Pougnet, Royal Naval Reserve
Engineer Commander Thomas Pierce Pover, Royal Naval Reserve
Lieutenant William Alfred Price 
Paymaster Lieutenant-Commander Cunningham Prior 
Lieutenant John Osment Richards, Royal Naval Reserve
Lieutenant-Commander Gerard Brook Riley 
Engineer-Commander Francis John Roskruge 
Lieutenant William Mill Ruxton, Royal Naval Reserve
Lieutenant Walter Thomas Ryan, Royal Naval Reserve
Engineer Lieutenant John Sandieson 
Engineer Lieutenant James Alfred Seabrook 
Surgeon Commander Ernest Albert Shaw 
Paymaster Lieutenant-Commander John Siddals 
Major James Simpson, Royal Marine Light Infantry
Major Charles Wynne Slaney, Royal Marine Light Infantry
Lieutenant-Commander John Ambrose Slee 
Lieutenant Harold Nevil Smart  Royal Naval Volunteer Reserve
Major Frederick H. Smith, Royal Marines
Lieutenant-Commander Norman George Fowler Snelling, Royal Naval Volunteer Reserve
Quartermaster and Honorary Major William George Sparrow, Royal Marine Artillery
Commander Martyn Frederic Stapylton 
Acting Chaplain the Rev. Richard Swann Swann-Mason 
Quartermaster and Honorary Major William Symes, Royal Marine Light Infantry
Lieutenant-Commander Reginald Molière Tabuteau 
Engineer Commander John Charles Talbot 
Lieutenant-Commander William Charles Tarrant, Royal Naval Reserve
Honorary Commander John Howard Temple, Royal Naval Volunteer Reserve
Lieutenant-Commander James Henry Thorn 
Commander Frank John Thring 
Lieutenant Henry William Cossart Tinker, Royal Naval Volunteer Reserve
Lieutenant Reginald Brooks Townshend, Royal Naval Volunteer Reserve
Paymaster Lieutenant John William Upham, Royal Naval Reserve
Lieutenant-Commander Bertram Vigne 
Shipwright Lieutenant-Commander Charles Rogers Vincent
Engineer Commander Charles James Mitchell Wallace 
Lieutenant Tacy Millett Winstanley Wallis, Royal Naval Volunteer Reserve
Lieutenant-Commander Charles Bertram Ward, Royal Naval Reserve
Lieutenant Alexander Watchlin, Royal Naval Reserve (New Zealand)
Lieutenant William Robert Watson, Royal Naval Volunteer Reserve
Commander Robert Lewis Way 
Commander Godfrey George Webster 
Commander Hans Thomas Fell White 
Commander Wallace Edgar Whittingham  Royal Naval Reserve
Lieutenant Charles Howard Windle, Royal Naval Volunteer Reserve
Lieutenant Edward Charles Wrey 
Lieutenant Stanley Harris Young, Royal Naval Volunteer Reserve
Lieutenant-Commander Thomas Wallace Young, Royal Naval Reserve

Army
Major Alexander Cecil Adair, Royal Scots Fusiliers
Major William David Allan, Royal Highlanders
Temp Captain Roy Dunlop Anderson  Middlesex Regiment
Honorary Lieutenant-Colonel Francis Havard Arnold, Royal Arony Ordnance Corps
Controller Alice L. Atkinson, Queen Mary's Army Auxiliary Corps
Captain Thomas John Day Atkinson, Unattd. List, and General List
Temp Major Ralph Bagnall, Special List
Temp Captain George Joseph Ball Special List
Major Harold Douglas Barnes  7th Battalion, London Regiment
Lieutenant Walter William Beale, Welsh Horse Yeomanry
Temp Lieutenant-Colonel Leonard Frank Beatson, Labour Corps
Captain Morris James Bell, 9th Battalion, Highland Light Infantry
Major Alexander John Munro Bennett  Territorial Force Reserve
Temp Major Cecil Bevis Bevis, Special List
Brevet Colonel Maurice William Palmer Block, late Royal Artillery
Major Arthur Reade Braid, late Royal Army Ordnance Corps
Major Arthur John Breakey, late Royal Artillery
Temp Captain Phillip John Broadley, late 11th Battalion, East Lancashire Regiment
Lieutenant-Colonel Arlhui Roile Bryant, 4th (Res) Battalion, Essex Regiment
Lieutenant Thomas Alfred Tovmsend Bucknill, Surrey Yeomanry
Colonel William Henry Bull  Army Medical Service
Major Sydney Collard Burton, Special List
Brevet Colonel Arthur Lewis Caldwell, late Royal Army Service Corps
Quartermaster and Major Aquila Clapshaw, Royal Army Medical Corps (ret. pay)
Lieutenant-Colonel Robert Joseph Cooke, late Cheshire Regiment
Temp Lieutenant Francis Wellington Corbet, Special List
Temp Lieutenant Peter Hood Cowan, Special List
Major Joshua John Cox  Royal Army Medical Corps Reserve
Temp Major Cecil Reginald Dibben, Special List
Captain William Swart Dittman, Royal Garrison Artillery
Quartermaster and Major Charles John Dixon, Extra Regimentally Employed List
Major Wilfred Chatterton Dumble, late Royal Engineers
Lieutenant-Colonel William Arnold Eaton, East Kent Regiment
Temp Major James Logan Ellis, Special List
Quartermaster and Major Philip Ellis, late Royal Engineers
Captain Maurice Woodman Emley, Royal Engineers 
Colonel Charles Ernest English, late Royal Artillery
Captain Charles Edward Etches, Royal Warwickshire Regiment
Captain Edward Leyland Cooke Feilden, late Highland Light Infantry
Temp Lieutenant David Forrest, Special List
Lieutenant-Colonel Sinclair Gair, 6th Battalion, Seaforth Highlanders
Lieutenant-Colonel Frederick James Gavin, late Royal Irish Regiment
Temp Captain Edward Christian Griffin, Royal Berkshire Regiment
Lieutenant-Colonel Andrew Haddon  late Unattached List
Major John Cyril Giffard Alers Hankey  Royal Artillery
Major William Richard Monyns Hartcup, Durham Light Infantry
Deputy Chief Controller Winifred S. Haythorne, Queen Mary's Army Auxiliary Corps
Brevet Colonel Arthur Beaumont Helyar, late Royal Artillery
Quartermaster and Lieutenant-Colonel Joseph Thomas Higgins, Royal Army Service Corps
Captain Henry Hincks  3rd Battalion, York & Lancaster Regiment
Controller Edith Marjory Hornblow, Queen Mary's Army Auxiliary Corps
Bt Colonel Randall Charles Annesley Howe, 3rd Battalion, York & Lancaster Regiment
Temp Lieutenant James Irvine, Special List
Temp Lieutenant Maximilian Jackson, late 16th Battalion Nottinghamshire and Derbyshire Regiment
Major Charles Maurice Jickling, 3rd Battalion, Norfolk Regiment
Captain Raymond Johnson  Royal Army Medical Corps
Major Frederick Arthur Kelley, Royal Defence Corps
Temp Major Hugh T. Ker  Royal Engineers
Captain Francis John Lambert, 9th Battalion, Durham Light Infantry
Lieutenant-Colonel John Irvine Lang-Hyde  late Royal Engineers
Temp Lieutenant-Colonel Ernest Lascelles, Rifle Brigade
Major Carteret de Mussenden Leathes, 5th Battalion, Royal Irish Rifles (Special Reserve)
Captain George Lee-Evans, 21st Battalion, Manchester Regiment
Temp Captain Fred Ball Ludlow   1st Battalion, Nottinghamshire and Derbyshire Regiment
Temp Major Michael McGuire, Special List
Lieutenant-Colonel John Robert Mallius  late Royal Army Medical Corps
Major Thomas Harris Manners-Howe, Royal Defence Corps
Lieutenant-Colonel and Honorary Colonel Edward Lethbridge Marsack, late 5th Battalion, Duke of Cornwall's Light Infantry
Major Henry Edmunds Mathews, 4th Battalion, Royal Sussex Regiment
Temp Lieutenant-Colonel Oswald Llewellyn Mathias, Special List, late the Welsh Regiment
Temp Captain Charles Stenteford Maxted, Special List
Temp Major Gaston Mayer, Special List
Temp Major Percy Douglas Michod, Royal Engineers
Brevet Major Thomas Cecil Russell Moore, Royal Army Service Corps
Temp Lieutenant James McVicar Munro, General List
Temp Major John Steward Napier, Royal Army Service Corps
Major Claud E. New, 3rd Battalion, East Surrey Regiment
Temp Major Harry Kottingham Newton  Royal Army Service Corps
Lieutenant-Colonel Edward North, Royal Engineers
Quartermaster and Major Charles Payne, Royal Engineers
Major Oswald Henry Pedley, late Northumberland Fusiliers
Lieutenant William David Pickin, General List
Lieutenant-Colonel Evelyn Hay Pollock  Royal Army Service Corps
Captain The Honourable Ralph Legge Pomeroy, 5th Dragoon Guards
Brevet Colonel Frank Romilly Reynolds, late Royal Engineers
Brevet Lieutenant-Colonel Philip Wigham Richardson, Reserve
Captain Graham Egerton Rickman, Royal Welsh Fusiliers
Doctor Adeline Roberts, Queen Mary's Army Auxiliary Corps, Recruiting Medical Controller
Temp Lieutenant William Rodick, Special List
Captain Francis John Rodwell, 4th Battalion, Suffolk Regiment
Captain John Edwin Rogerson, T.F. Reserve, General List
Captain Henry Gordon Rowe, Royal Artillery
Temp Honorary Major Isidore Salmon, General List
Lieutenant-Colonel Victor Henry Sylvester Scratchley  late King's Royal Rifle Corps
Quartermaster and Major John Shannon, Royal Irish Fusiliers
Major Oswald Murton Short, Tyne Electrical Engineers
Quartermaster and Major Thomas George Skeats, Extra Regimentally Employed List
Major Richard Josiah Smyly, North Lancashire Regiment
Quartermaster and Major Benjamin Smyth  Special List
Temp Major Walter Field Soames, late Captain, Royal West Kent Regiment
Brevet Major John Percy Somers, Reserve
Captain Eustace John William Spread   North Lancashire Regiment
Captain Hedley Herbert Stacke, East Surrey Regiment
Lieutenant-Colonel Sir Pieter Canzius van Blommestein Stewart-Bam, 7th Battalion, London Regiment
Major Arthur Street, Royal Army Service Corps
Brevet Colonel Charles John Willmer Tatharn, late Royal Army Medical Corps
Captain Harold William Vazeille Tempedey, Fife and Forfar Yeomanry
Quartermaster and Major Thomas Hastings Tennant, Royal Engineers
Assistant Chief Controller Edith Thompson, Queen Mary's Army Auxiliary Corps
Brevet Lieutenant-Colonel Harry Adair Thompson, late 3rd Dragoon Guards
Deputy Chief Controller Jean Glass Thompson, Queen Mary's Army Auxiliary Corps
Lieutenant-Colonel Edward Treffry  Honourable Artillery Company
Major Henry Tristem, Royal Army Ordnance Corps
Lieutenant-Colonel Henry Edward Vallentin  Royal Artillery
Major Cliffe Henry Vigors, Royal Irish Regiment
Captain James Glencorse Wakelin, 5th Battalion, Royal Scots Fusiliers
Quartermaster and Major John Ward, late Royal Dublin Fusiliers
Quartermaster and Lieutenant Cuthbert
Philip Warner, late Royal Army Service Corps
Lieutenant-Colonel Henry Wilson Weekes  Royal Engineers
Major Charles Alexander Wheeler, Postal Section, Royal Engineers
Captain John Sinclair White  Royal Army Medical Corps
Quartermaster and Major Sam Beck Wildman, Royal Army Service Corps
Major John Maurice Wingfield  late Coldstream Guards
Lieutenant-Colonel Charles Camden Wiseman-Clarke, late Royal Artillery
Colonel Charles Knight Wood, late Royal Engineers
Lieutenant-Colonel Evelyn Fitzgerald Michell Wood  Royal Garrison Artillery
Colonel Frederick Augustus Yorke, late Royal Artillery
Captain Albert Cecil Bussell, Attached to Mechanical Warfare Department, Ministry of Munitions
Major Percival Charles Cannon, Inspector of Mechanical Transport Vehicles, Ministry of Munitions, U.S.A.
Captain John Fleetwood Cumming, National Service Representative, Inverness Area
Major Charles Sempill de Segundo  Deputy Commissioner of Medical Services, Ministry of National Service
Lieutenant John Campbell Gardner, Assistant Superintendent (Guns) at a National Factory, Ministry of Munitions
Lieutenant-Colonel Montagu Francis Markham Sloane-Kittoe  Section Director, Railway Materials Department, Ministry of Munitions
Major Thomas Henry Lloyd, Chief Inspector, Munitions Recruiting Areas
Captain Ernest Maclaghan Wedderburn  Experimental Department, Ministry of Munitions
Major Murray MacLeod, Inspector of Filled Fuzes, Directorate of Inspection of Gun Ammunition (Supervisory) Woolwich Arsenal
Captain Henry Hartley Aloysius Russell, Assistant Director of National Service, Reading
Captain Donald Boase Sinclair, Secretary, London and South-Eastern Region, Ministry of National Service
Captain Edward Rawdon Smith, Assistant Secretary, Ministry of National Service
Captain Reginald John Wallis-Jones, Section Director, Iron and Steel Production Department, Ministry of Munitions
Lieutenant the Honourable Harold James Selborne Woodhouse, National Service Representative, Hammersmith

Overseas Military Forces of Canada
Lieutenant-Colonel Frederick Walter Gale Anderson, Canadian Forestry Corps
Major Thomas Richey Caldwell, 21st Battalion, Canadian Infantry
Major Charles Vincent Campbell, Canadian Forestry Corps
Lieutenant-Colonel George Hamilton Cassels, 2nd Central Ontario Regiment
Major Alexander Don Cornett, Chaplain Canadian Forestry Corps
Honorary Major Lawrence Adam Dowie, Canadian General List
Major John Guerney Fordham, Canadian Railway Troops
Major Austin Bain Gillies, Canadian Field Artillery
Captain James Roberts Goodall, Canadian Army Medical Corps
Major John Jeffery   13th Canadian Infantry Battalion
Major James Hawkins Lindsay, Eastern Ontario Regiment
Major Percy Crannell McGillivray, Canadian Army Service Corps
Major William Geekie Morrison, Canadian Army Pay Corps
Lieutenant-Colonel John Arthur Clark Mowbray, Canadian Army Pay Corps
Lieutenant-Colonel Richard Raikes, Canadian Army Medical Corps
Acting Lieutenant-Colonel Jason Rudolph Routh, Canadian Ordnance Corps
Lieutenant-Colonel Albert Alexander Smith, Canadian Dental Corps
Major John Eliot Swinburne, Canadian Forestry Corps
Major Albert William Winnett, Canadian Army Dental Corps
Lieutenant-Colonel Wolston Thomas Workman   Canadian Chaplain Services

Australian Imperial Force
Major Francis Teulon Beamish, Australian Army Medical Corps
Lieutenant-Colonel Stephen Bruggy  Australian Imperial Force
Major John Egbert Down, Australian Army Dental Corps
Major Guy Sherington, General List
Lieutenant-Colonel Bertram Milne Sutherland, Australian Army Medical Corps
Major Walter Oswald Watt, Australian Flying Corps
Major George Charles Willcocks   Australian Army Medical Corps
Lieutenant-Colonel Charleton Yeatman, Australian Army Medical Corps

Administrative Headquarters of New Zealand
Major Percy de Bathe Brandon, New Zealand Army Pay Corps
Major Andrew Seymour Brewis  New Zealand Medical Corps
Major William Bruce  New Zealand Medical Corps
Major Raymond Alexander Reid Lawry, Canterbury Regiment

Union of South Africa
Temp Major Henry Percival Mills, 3rd Battalion, South African Infantry
Temp Major Maurice Grey Pearson  South African Medical Corps

For services rendered in connection with military operations in France and Flanders
Temp Captain Josiah Logan Adams, Royal Engineers
Captain Harold Cotterell Adams, Royal Army Medical Corps
Major William Henry Adams, Royal Army Ordnance Corps
Major Chilton Lind Addison-Smith, 3rd Seaforth Highlanders
Lieutenant-Colonel William John Patrick Adye-Curran, Royal Army Medical Corps
Lieutenant Norman Allan, Royal Army Service Corps
Lieutenant William Allard, Royal Engineers
Temp Captain Rupert Allcard, Royal Engineers
Temp Captain Abraham Allen, General List
Major Henry Chester Allin, Royal Army Service Corps
Temp Captain John Goldwell Ambrose   Royal Engineers
Lieutenant Nevill Anderson  5th London Regiment
Temp Captain Alfred Anderson-Pelham, Royal Field Artillery
Temp Captain John Stanley Arkle  Royal Army Medical Corps
Captain William Ascott, Royal Army Veterinary Corps
Lieutenant Edward Atkin, Royal Garrison Artillery
Temp Lieutenant Arthur Atkinson, Royal Engineers
Major John Atkinson  Royal Army Service Corps
Captain Harold Frederick Atter, 1/4th Yorkshire Light Infantry
Captain Frank Baker, 5th Royal Welsh Fusiliers and Labour Corps
Temp Major Nigel Barington Balfour, Royal Army Service Corps
Temp Major Thomas Balston  General List
Major Maxwell Richard Crosbie, Viscount Bangor, late Royal Artillery
Quartermaster and Major Thomas Barber  1st Hertfordshire Regiment
Lieutenant Norman Leslie Barker, Royal Engineers
Rev. Sydney Reeves Barnes, Royal Army Chaplains' Department
Temp Captain Sydney Norman Barren   Royal Engineers
Lieutenant Geoffrey Selwyn Barrow, Royal Field Artillery
Lieutenant-Colonel Harold Percy Waller Barrow  Royal Army Medical Corps
Lieutenant Edward George Bartlett   King's Own Yorkshire Light Infantry
Captain Charles Botterill Baxter  Royal Army Medical Corps
Captain Robert William Beacham   Northamptonshire Regiment
Lieutenant Basil Perry Beale   Royal Army Service Corps
Temp Captain Horace Owen Compton Beasley, Labour Corps
Captain William John Beckwith, Royal Army Ordnance Corps
Temp Captain Arthur Beney, Royal Army Service Corps
Major Thomas Edwin Bennett  Royal Army Service Corps
Brevet Lieutenant-Colonel Christopher Robert Berkeley  Welsh Regiment
Temp Captain Reginald Edgar Besant, General List (late North Lancashire Regiment)
Lieutenant Falconer Moffat Birks, Royal Army Service Corps
Temp Lieutenant James Leatham Birley, Royal Army Medical Corps
Temp Major John Blades, Royal Engineers
Temp Captain Charles Frederick Blake, Royal Army Service Corps
Major Henry d'Arnim Blumberg  Royal Army Medical Corps
Temp Lieutenant Stanley Abbott Bonner, Royal Engineers
Temp Lieutenant Douglas Borden-Turner, General List
Captain Johnathan Scott Bowden, Royal Army Veterinary Corps
Lieutenant Arthur William Bowyer, 4th East Surrey Regiment
Rev. Arthur Hamilton Boyd  Royal Army Chaplains' Department
Temp Captain James Maudsley Brander, Royal Army Service Corps
Acting Captain Henry George Brayrooke, Royal Army Ordnance Corps
Captain Frederick Rudolf Esmonde Dowes Brenan, Cambridgeshire Regiment
Temp Lieutenant Charles Herbert Bressey, Royal Engineers
Captain Arthur Edwin Briggs, Royal Army Service Corps
Temp Captain Harold Neilson Brinson  Labour Corps
Temp Lieutenant George S. Brown, General List (late York & Lancaster Regiment)
Lieutenant Thomas Brown   Welsh Horse Yeomanry
Captain Frederick Julius Bull, Reserve (Middlesex Regiment)
Lieutenant John James Bulman   Royal Engineers
Captain Launcelot Henry Beaumont Burlton   Royal Army Service Corps
Temp Captain Eric Francis Burn, General List
Captain Harold Burrows  Royal Army Medical Corps
Captain Reginald Stevens Burt, General List
Temp Major Arthur Burtenshaw   Royal Army Service Corps
Temp Major Percy Collingwood Burton, Special List
Captain Arnold Charles Paul Butler, King's Royal Rifle Corps
Temp Major Frank Norman Butler, Royal Engineers
Captain Henry Basil Bacon Butler, Royal Army Service Corps
Temp Captain Christopher Rawlinson Cadge, General List
Major Edmond Leveson Calverley, Essex Regiment
Temp 2nd Lieutenant Ernest Walter Camp, Labour Corps
Temp Lieutenant Archibald Sydney Campbell, General List
Temp Captain Cyril Cansdale, General List
Captain William Philip Cantrell Cantrell-Hubbersty, 15th Hussars
Captain Francis Julius Fay Carr, Scottish Rifles
Major Lawrence Carr  Gordon Highlanders
Temp Captain Edward Rogers Cartwright, Royal Engineers
Temp Lieutenant Henry Slater Chaplin, Royal Army Ordnance Corps
Temp Captain Guy Patterson Chapman, Royal Fusiliers
Quartermaster and Captain John Damian Chapman, Royal Army Medical Corps
Temp Captain Richard Charles  Royal Army Medical Corps
Temp Captain Robert Chignell, Royal Army Service Corps
Captain Armando Dumas-Child  Royal Army Medical Corps
Captain Sydney James Clegg, Royal Army Medical Corps
Captain Clarence Beaufort Cockburn, Royal Army Service Corps
Captain Arthur Francis St. Clair Collins, Royal Army Service Corps
Temp Major Robert William Cooper  General List
Temp Lieutenant-Colonel William Linford Edward Cooper, General List
Temp Lieutenant Edward James O'Cinidi Cordner, Royal Army Service Corps
Major William Ernest Leslie Cotton  Worcestershire Regiment
Major Malcolm Coutts, Royal Army Service Corps
Temp Captain Eric Tennant Cowan, General List
Temp Captain Noel Anthony Coward  Royal Army Medical Corps
Brevet Lieutenant-Colonel John Evelyn Edmund Craster, Royal Engineers
Temp Lieutenant Henry Aubrey Crowe, Royal Army Veterinary Corps
Temp Lieutenant John Davidson, Royal Engineers
Lieutenant Alexander Horace Davis   Royal Garrison Artillery
Captain William Henderson Davison, Royal Army Medical Corps
Temp Captain Christian Richard John Day, Royal Army Service Corps
Major Percy William Dayer-Smith, Royal Army Veterinary Corps
Lieutenant Arthur Joseph de Carrara-Rivers, Royal Garrison Artillery
Major Herbert Joseph Norman de Salis, Royal Engineers
Temp Captain Rudolf Edgar de Trafford, General List
Temp Captain Joseph Devlin, General List
Temp Captain Frederick Thomas Dickerson, Labour Corps
Temp Major William Stewart Dickie  Royal Army Medical Corps
Captain Harry Lionel Ffortington Dimmock, Royal Garrison Artillery
Lieutenant-Colonel Thomas Dowling, Royal Army Service Corps
Captain John Hughes Drake   Hertfordshire Yeomanry
Rev. George Simpson Duncan, Royal Army Chaplains' Department
Captain Arthur Geoffrey Dunsterville, Argyll and Sutherland Highlanders
Temp Major Frank Rogers Durham   Royal Engineers
Major Arthur Murray Duthie  Royal Field Artillery
Lieutenant Reginald Percival Sidney Edden, 3rd Lancashire Fusiliers
Temp Major Courtenay Harold Wish Edmonds, Royal Engineers
Lieutenant-Colonel John Egginton  Reserve and Labour Corps 
Brevet Major George William Ellis, Royal Army Medical Corps
Temp Captain and Quartermaster Harry Launcelot Etherington-Smith, Royal Army Medical Corps
Temp Captain Cyril McLaurin Euan-Smith   Royal Garrison Artillery
Major Arthur Kelly Evans   Royal Marine Light Infantry
Temp Captain Frederick Navaire Fane, Special List
Lieutenant Edward Elgar Field, 5th Duke of Cornwall's Light Infantry and Royal Engineers
Lieutenant Maurice Edward William Fitzgerald, Royal Engineers
Temp Captain Dennis Foster, Labour Corps
Temp Captain Frank Fox, Royal Artillery
Lieutenant Walter Fox, Royal Engineers
Temp Major Thomas Martin Frood, Royal Army Medical Corps
Captain Samuel Alwyne Gabb  Worcestershire Regiment
Major Humphrey Percival Gamon, South Staffordshire Regiment
Temp Captain John Cyril Gardner, Royal Army Service Corps
Rev. Herbert Charles Gaye, Royal Army Chaplains' Department
Captain Alexander Ebenezer McLean Geddes
Temp Captain Charles Dennis Victor George, Royal Engineers
Captain William Herbert Dore Giffin, Royal Army Service Corps
Major Francis Ambrose d'Oyley Goddard, Royal Munster Fusiliers
Lieutenant-Colonel Sydney Frederick Herbert Goffin, Financial Advisers Department
Temp Major Ernest Gold  Royal Engineers
Temp Major George Gonsalves, Royal Army Service Corps
Captain Robert Aubrey Gooderidge, Royal Army Veterinary Corps
Temp Captain Willis Gould, General List, attd. Royal Artillery
Quartermaster and Major Edward Sainsbury Goulding, 1/6th Liverpool Regiment
Lieutenant Charles Ronald Graham, General List
Captain Harold John Graham, 3rd Dorsetshire Regiment
Captain Stuart Colquhoun Grant, Hertfordshire Yeomanry
Captain Geoffrey William Grasett, Royal Army Service Corps
Captain Alexander Mungo Gray, 5th Scottish Rifles, attached Labour Corps
Temp Major George Douglas Gray  Royal Army Medical Corps
Captain Francis Ley Augustus Greaves, Royal Army Medical Corps
Temp Quartermaster and Captain Thomas Green, 6th Dorsetshire Regiment
Temp Captain James Macintosh Greenall, Royal Army Service Corps
Temp Captain Arthur Hyde Greg  Royal Army Medical Corps
Temp Captain Llewelyn Wyn Griflith, General List
Temp Lieutenant Edmond Arthur Hudson Groom, Labour Corps
Temp Lieutenant Douglas Hewitt Hacking, Royal Army Service Corps
Temp Captain Norman McLeod Hall, Royal Engineers
Captain Joseph Thomas Halligan, Royal Dublin Fusiliers
Temp Captain Albert Hamilton, Royal Army Service Corps
Captain Thomas Watson Hancock, Royal Army Medical Corps
Temp Captain William Dawson Harbinson, Royal Army Ordnance Corps
Captain Walter Hardy, Royal Garrison Artillery
Temp Lieutenant R. George Powel Hare, Royal Army Ordnance Corps
Temp 2nd Lieutenant Frank Harrison, Labour Corps
Temp Captain Gilbert Hart   Royal Engineers
Temp Lieutenant Percy Edgar Harvey, Royal Engineers
Captain James George Hay  late Gordon Highlanders
Temp Captain John Harry Hebb  Royal Army Medical Corps
Lieutenant Alan Keith Henderson, Royal Wiltshire Yeomanry
Captain Alexander Mitchell Henderson, Royal Artillery
Captain Herbert Purse Henderson, Royal Army Service Corps
Major John Steill Henderson, 1/8th Argyll and Sutherland Highlanders
Lieutenant Matthew Bo Ian Henderson   Royal Field Artillery
Captain Hugh Middleton Heppel, Essex Regiment, attd. Labour Corps
Temp Captain James John William Herbertson, General List
Temp Captain Cecil Matthew Higgins   Special List
Temp Major William George Higgins, Royal Army Service Corps
Temp Captain John Hill, Royal Army Veterinary Corps
Major John Arthur Hill, Royal Army Service Corps
Temp Major Reginald Day Finch Hill, Royal Army Service Corps
Temp Captain Oswald Thomas Hatchings, Special List
Major Reginald Arthur Hobbs, 2nd Monmouth Regiment
Temp Captain Lionel Brewer Hogarth, General List
Captain Henry William Holland  Inns of Court Officers Training Corps
Temp Lieutenant Bernard Whelpton Holman, Royal Engineers
Captain Samuel Edward Holmes, Royal Army Veterinary Corps
Temp Captain Edward Stewart Hornidge, Royal Army Service Corps
Major George William Horsfield, Royal Garrison Artillery
Temp Honorary Major Thomas Houston, Royal Army Medical Corps
Temp Captain William Bawson Hughes   Royal Army Service Corps
Major Charles Bobert Inghant Hull  Royal Army Service Corps
Lieutenant-Colonel Charles John Huskinson  1/8th Nottinghamshire and Derbyshire Regiment
Lieutenant Herbert John Impson   Norfolk Regiment
Temp Captain Arthur Lockyer Ingpen, General List
Lieutenant Isaac Benjamin Isaacs, Royal Army Service Corps
Captain Hugh Cleivion Jagger, Royal Army Veterinary Corps
Temp Major Arthur Ainslie Johnson, General List
Major Henry James Jones, Royal Army Ordnance Corps
Lieutenant Henry Alexander Judd, 2nd King Edward's Horse
Captain Arthur Ernest Jury, Royal Army Medical Corps
Temp Major Bertram Francis Eardley Keeling  Royal Engineers
Quartermaster and Captain James Kennington General List
Temp Captain William Lord Coke Kerr, Royal Army Service Corps
Rev. Bernard William Keymer, Royal Army Chaplains' Department
Captain William Bernard Richardson King, 7th Battalion, Royal Welsh Fusiliers
Temp Quartermaster and Captain William Henry Daniel King, Machine Gun Corps
Temp Captain William Harold Kinnersley, Royal Army Service Corps
Lieutenant-Colonel Hubert Vernon Kitson, Royal Army Service Corps
Captain Harold Arthur Lane, 18th London Regiment
Captain Thomas Witheridge Langman, 5th Welsh Regiment
Lieutenant Percy John Larter, 5th Dragoon Guards
Temp Captain Donald Saunders Laurie, Royal Engineers
Temp Captain Robert Douglas Laurie  Royal Army Medical Corps
Temp Major Eric St. John Lawson, General List
Temp Captain John Hanson Lawson, Royal Engineers
Captain Wentworth Dillon Lawson, Royal Army Service Corps
Temp Major Claude Lancelot Leake  General List
Major Arthur Neale Lee  7th Battalion, Nottinghamshire and Derbyshire Regiment
Temp Captain Lancelot Raoul Lemprière  Royal Army Medical Corps
Captain Percy Vere Leresche, Royal Army Service Corps
Temp Major Bradford Leslie, Royal Engineers
Captain Wilfred Hubert Foyer Lewis, Glamorgan Yeomanry
Captain Wilfrid Gordon Lindsell  Royal Artillery
Captain Thomas Arthur Lodge, 24th Battalion, London Regiment
Captain Sydney Herbert Long, Royal Engineers (S.R. Supplementary List)
Captain Reginald Dawson Hopcraft Lough  Royal Marine Light Infantry
Captain Harry Leslie Bache Lovatt   6th Battalion, South Staffordshire Regiment and Royal Engineers
Lieutenant Robert Lindsay Loyd   16th Lancers and Royal Engineers
Temp Major Gilbert Somerville Lynde, Royal Engineers
Captain James McArthur, Royal Army Veterinary Corps
Major Frank Alexander McCammon  Royal Army Medical Corps
Temp Captain Robert Stuart McCullough, Royal Army Service Corps
Temp 2nd Lieutenant Duncan McDonald, Labour Corps
Temp Captain Bernard Aloysius McGuire, Royal Army Veterinary Corps
Captain George Patrick McGuire, 4th West Riding Regiment
Captain James William Francis McLachlan, Cameron Highlanders
Temp Captain Charles Alexander McLellan, General List
Temp Captain James Walter McLeod  Royal Army Medical Corps
Temp Quartermaster and Captain Daniel Mahoney, 7th Border Regiment
Captain William Francis Marchant, 20th London Regiment
Captain Leslie Howard Marten, 9th London Regiment
Major Albert Wilberforce Mason, retired T.F.,  Royal Army Veterinary Corps
Temp Captain Henry George Mason, Royal Army Ordnance Corps
Temp Captain Lawrence Mason   Royal Artillery
Major Charles Montague Hamilton Massey, Coldstream Guards
Major Lawrence Colley Maurice, Royal Engineers
Lieutenant Arthur Willders Montague Mawby, Royal Engineers
Captain George David Melville   Welsh Regiment
Rev. Cecil Frank Miles-Cadman, Royal Army Chaplains' Department
Lieutenant Ernest James Mills, 5th Cheshire Regiment
Captain Geoffrey Horner Mills, Royal Army Service Corps
Major James Jesse Mills, Royal Army Ordnance Corps
Major Harry Weston Moggridge, 2nd City of London Yeomanry
Captain Brian Charles Molony, Hertfordshire Regiment
Temp Captain Roy Thornton Monier-Williams, General List
Temp Lieutenant Bernard Donald Crawford Morgan, General List
Temp Captain George Urquhart Morgan, Royal Engineers
Lieutenant The Honourable Harry Nugent Morgan-Grenville, Royal Engineers
Temp Lieutenant John Eraser Morrison, Royal Army Ordnance Corps
Temp Captain James Finbarr Mullins, Labour Corps
Temp Captain Wilfred George Mumford  Royal Army Medical Corps
Rev. Alfred Thomas Arthur Naylor, Royal Army Chaplains' Department
Major William Walter Raymond Neale, Royal Army Veterinary Corps
Brevet Lieutenant-Colonel James Owen Nelson, Worcestershire Regiment and Labour Corps
Temp Lieutenant Maurice Michael Neville, Royal Army Service Corps
Temp Captain William Newbold, Royal Garrison Artillery
Captain John Campin Newman  Royal Army Medical Corps
Temp Lieutenant Samuel William Nicholas, Royal Engineers
Temp Major Tressilian Charles Nicholas   Royal Engineers
Lieutenant John Gretton Oakley, 7th Hampshire Regiment and Labour Corps
Captain Benjamin Alexander Odium, Royal Army Medical Corps
Temp Major John William Oldfield  General List
Temp Major Christopher Percy Oswald, General List
Quartermaster and Captain Joseph Thomas Packard, Royal Army Medical Corps
Quartermaster and Major Edward Augustus Parker  1st Royal Welsh Fusiliers
Captain Ernest William Parks, Royal Army Veterinary Corps
Temp Captain Arthur Nesbit Patchett, Royal Army Service Corps
Temp Captain Edward Henry William Patridge, Royal Army Service Corps
Lieutenant Leonard Thomas Peach, Royal Army Service Corps
Temp Captain Richard William Pearson, Royal Army Service Corps
Temp Captain Edward Irving Pownel Pellew, Royal Army Medical Corps
Temp Captain Thomas Oswald Pepper, Royal Engineers
Temp Quartermaster and Captain George John Pitt, 12th Manchester Regiment
Captain Cyril Charlie Hamilton Potter, 10th Hussars
Quartermaster and Captain Thomas Potter  Argyll and Sutherland Highlanders
Captain Richard Pascal Power, Royal Irish Fusiliers
Captain Basil C. Prance, Labour Corps
Temp Major Frank Price, Royal Army Service Corps
Lieutenant William Edward Price, 6th Welsh Regiment
Rev. William Alfred Prunell, Royal Army Chaplains' Department
Lieutenant Temp Captain William John Pugh, 6th Royal Welsh Fusiliers
Captain Eustace Cuthbert Quilter, 4th Suffolk Regiment, attd. Tank Corps
Captain Arthur Samuel Radcliff, Royal Army Service Corps
Captain Kenneth Cochrane Raikes, Monmouthshire Regiment
Captain Jeffrey Ramsay  Royal Army Medical Corps
Temp Major Herwald Ramsbotham  General List
Captain Charles Arthur Rathbone, 3rd South Lancashire Regiment
Temp Lieutenant Cyril Percival Renouf, Tank Corps
Captain Walter Philip Kearns Reynolds, Royal Army Service Corps
Lieutenant Alexander Robertson Riach, Royal Army Service Corps
Temp Major Arthur Henry Rice, General List
Captain Thomas William Richardson, Royal Army Service Corps
Temp Captain Arthur Patrick William Rickman, General List
Temp Captain Thomas Clark Ritchie, Royal Army Medical Corps
Temp Major Geoffray Dorling Roberts, General List
Lieutenant Andrew Clark Robertson, Royal Army Service Corps
Major Bernard Ismay Rolling  Royal Engineers
Temp Captain Albert Alexander Roth, Royal Army Ordnance Corps
Major William Edward Rothwell  Royal Inniskilling Fusiliers
Captain Arthur Noel Rountree, Royal Army Service Corps
Temp Captain Alfred Corrie Rouse, Royal Army Service Corps
Temp Captain Ernest George Rowden, Special List
Major Albert Henry Royds, Scots Guards
Lieutenant Alan Arthur Saunders, Royal Engineers
Temp Captain Alexander Patterson Scotland, Special List
Temp Captain The Honourable Michael Scott, Special List
Major William Selby-Lowndes, Bedford Yeomanry
Temp Lieutenant-Colonel Theophilus Hengist Sergeant, General List
Captain Aubrey Temple Sharp, 6th Battalion, Leicestershire Regiment and Machine Gun Corps
Temp Major Frederick Arthur Shaw, Labour Corps
Captain Peter Shaw, Lancaster Hussars and Tank Corps
Captain Edward Sigrist, Royal Army Ordnance Corps
Lieutenant-Colonel Alexander Petrie Simpson, Royal Scots
Lieutenant William Thomas Smellie, 6th Argyll and Sutherland Highlanders
Temp Lieutenant Albert George Smith, Royal Engineers (Signal Service)
Quartermaster and Captain John William Smith, 1st King's Shropshire Light Infantry
Temp Captain Leslie Harcourt Smith, General List, late East Yorkshire Regiment
Lieutenant-Colonel Alfred Bertram Soltau  Royal Army Medical Corps
Temp Major Arnold Colin Somervell, Royal Army Service Corps
Lieutenant-Colonel Edward Wilfred Spedding  Royal Field Artillery
Temp Captain Ralph Henley Speed, Royal Army Service Corps
Temp Major Harold Ernest Spencer, Royal Engineers
Temp Major Francis Jeffries Spranger, Royal Army Ordnance Corps
Quartermaster and Captain John Winchester Springhall, East Yorkshire Regiment
Captain George William Robert Stackpoole  South Staffordshire Regiment
Temp Captain Waddington Stafford, Royal Army Service Corps
Temp Major William Stanford, Royal Field Artillery
Temp Major James Stanley, General List
Major Reginald William Starkey Stanton, Yorkshire Light Infantry
Temp Lieutenant Frank Joseph Starr, Special List
Lieutenant Hubert Stanley Stephens, Honourable Artillery Company
Captain James Stevenson, Royal Engineers
Major Herbert Arthur Stewart  Royal Army Service Corps
Temp Captain William Hendry Burgess Stewart, Royal Engineers
Captain George Edward Stokes, 15th London Regiment
Temp Lieutenant Philip Arthur Stone, Royal Army Service Corps
Captain Alan Thomas Trevor Storey, South Lancashire Regiment
Temp Captain Orlando Sumner, Royal Engineers
Major William Greenwood Sutcliffe, Royal Army Medical Corps
Captain Arthur Henry Carr Sutherland   Royal Highlanders
Temp Lieutenant Willam Hugh Swallow, Royal Army Ordnance Corps
Temp Lieutenant Francis Hugh Swanzy, Royal Army Ordnance Corps
Rev. Frank Morris Sykes, Royal Army Chaplains' Department
Temp Major Henry Pascoe Blair Tayler  General List
Quartermaster and Captain Alfred William Taylor   9th West Yorkshire Regiment
Temp Captain Charles Gerald Taylor, Royal Army Service Corps
Lieutenant-Colonel Charles Hillsborough Rimington Taylor, 4th Battalion, Essex Regiment and Labour Corps
Temp Captain Frederick Henry Tebay, Royal Garrison Artillery
Lieutenant-Colonel Henry Lancelot Tennant, Royal Field Artillery
Captain Joseph Makepeace Thackeray, 3rd Suffolk Regiment and Labour Corps
Captain Reginald Sparshatt Thatcher   3rd Somerset Light Infantry
Major David Brodie Thomas, Leicestershire Regiment
Captain George Pollard Thomas, Royal Garrison Artillery
Temp Lieutenant Sydney Arnold Thomas, Royal Engineers
Temp Captain Thomas Charles Thomas, Labour Corps
Major Cecil Henry Farrer Thompson  London Regiment
Temp Lieutenant Reginald Ernest Thompson, Royal Army Service Corps
Major Alan Charles Tod, Royal Field Artillery
Lieutenant Geoffrey Stewart Tomkinson  Worcestershire Regiment
Quartermaster and Captain Thomas Toohill, Royal Army Service Corps
Temp Major Edward Charles Lyndhurst Towne, Labour Corps
Temp Captain Charles Stancomb Lisle Trask, General List
Temp Captain Frank Newton Tribe, General List
Major Lechmere Howell Tudor, South Wales Borderers
Temp Captain James Lockley Turner, Royal Army Service Corps
Captain Montagu Trevor Turner, 3rd Sussex Regiment
Major Thomas Barton Unwin  Royal Army Medical Corps
Temp Lieutenant Winchcombe Norman Carpenter Van Grutten   Royal Artillery
Temp Lieutenant-Colonel Voltelin Albert William Van der Byl, 1st Cape Coloured Labour Battalion
Temp Quartermaster and Captain James Varley, Royal Army Medical Corps
Captain Guy Noel Vivian, Grenadier Guards
Captain William Warwick Wagstaffe  Royal Army Medical Corps
Temp Captain James Blake Walker, Royal Army Veterinary Corps
Temp Captain Kenneth Macfarlane Walker  Royal Army Medical Corps
Brevet Major Charles John Wallace  Highland Light Infantry
Temp Captain Henry Douglas Delves Walthall, Royal Army Service Corps
Temp Captain Felix Walter Warre  General List
Major Robert Edward Webb, York & Lancaster Regiment
Captain George Frederick Anderson Webster, Royal Army Ordnance Corps
Captain Herbert Mansfield Whitehead, 7th Battalion, Nottinghamshire and Derbyshire Regiment
Rev. Richard B. Wilkinson, Royal Army Chaplains' Department
Temp Major John Eason Wilks, Royal Army Service Corps, attd. Tank Corps
Lieutenant Alfred Dalby Ross Williams, Royal Garrison Artillery
Temp Lieutenant Roger Francis Williams, Royal Engineers
Major Sir Gilbert Alan Hamilton Wills  Royal North Devonshire Yeomanry
Temp Lieutenant Andrew Wilson, Royal Engineers
Temp Captain Humphrey Bowstead Wilson  Royal Army Medical Corps
Lieutenant-Colonel William Quintyne Winwood  5th Dragoon Guards
Captain Thomas Blakeway Wolstenholme, Royal Army Medical Corps
Captain Alexander Lewis Sandison Wood, Royal Army Service Corps
Lieutenant-Colonel Ernest Wood  Royal Army Service Corps, 5th Divisional Train
Major Ernest James Woodley, York & Lancaster Regiment
Temp Lieutenant Charles Archie Worssam, Royal Army Ordnance Corps
Captain Frank Worthington  Royal Army Medical Corps
Captain Donald Henry FitzThomas Wyley   Royal Field Artillery
Brevet Major Owen Evelyn Wynne, Royal Engineers
Temp Captain Noel Leigh Yorke, Royal Army Service Corps

Overseas Military Forces of Canada

For services rendered in connection with military operations in France and Flanders
Major William Frederick Alderson, Canadian Army Service Corps
Major George Grassie Archibald, 1st Central Ontario Regiment
Captain Nevill Alexander Drummond Armstrong, 16th Battalion, Manitoba Regiment
Lieutenant George Russell Birch, Canadian Ordnance Corps
Lieutenant-Colonel Percy Gordon Brown, Canadian Army Medical Corps
Major John Frederick Burgess, Canadian Army Medical Corps
Lieutenant-Colonel Frank John Carew, Canadian Forestry Corps
Lieutenant-Colonel Harry James Cowan, Saskatchewan Regiment
Lieutenant-Colonel Anson Dulmage, Saskatchewan Regiment, attached Labour Corps
Honorary Captain George Wilfred Fisher, Canadian Young Men's Christian Association
Captain John Dennin Grimsdick, Manitoba Regiment
Major William Sinclair Herchmer, Canadian Forestry Corps
Captain Hedley Hill, Canadian Army Pay Corps
Honorary Captain William Burton Hurd, Canadian Young Men's Christian Association
Quartermaster and Honorary Captain William Henry Lettice, 47th Battalion, Western Ontario Regiment
Major Norman James Lindsay, Canadian Army Service Corps (M.T.)
Major Robert James McEwan, Canadian Army Medical Corps
Major James William McLeod, Canadian Army Service Corps
Captain William Cameron Mackintosh, 28th Battalion, Saskatchewan Regiment
Lieutenant Charles Barker Maxwell, Canadian General List
Lieutenant-Colonel Henry Montgomery-Campbell, Nova Scotia Regiment
Lieutenant-Colonel Hugh Edwin Munroe, Canadian Army Medical Corps
Temp Major Kenneth A. Murray, Canadian Army Postal Corps
Major Harold Orr, Canadian Army Medical Corps
Captain Creighton Ross Palmer, Canadian Army Pay Corps
Captain Samuel Charles Richards, Canadian Army Veterinary Corps
Captain Albert Angus Richardson, Canadian Engineers
Captain William Adam Robertson, Canadian Army Veterinary Corps
Major Charles Wilson Robinson, Canadian Forestry Corps
Major William Henry Robinson, Canadian Army Service Corps
Lieutenant-Colonel Charles McAdam Scott, Canadian Army Service Corps
Captain Cecil Compton Thomas, Canadian Army Service Corps
Major William Raymond Thomson, Canadian Army Pay Corps
Captain Frederick William Utton, 14th Canadian Infantry Battalion
Major Harold Weatherald Webster, Canadian Army Service Corps (M.T.)
Matron Bertha Jane Willoughby  Canadian Army Medical Corps

Australian Imperial Force
For services rendered in connection with military operations in France and Flanders:
Captain Robert Cairns Amis Anderson, 19th Battalion, Australian Imperial Force
Captain Robert Gordon Chirnside, General List, Australian Imperial Force
Major John William Donnelly, General List, Australian Imperial Force
Major David Moore Embelton, Australian Army Medical Corps
Major Charles Napier Finn, Australian Army Medical Corps
Captain William Lockhart Hamilton, Australian Army Service Corps
Lieutenant Gordon John Cooper Hargreaves, Australian Engineers
Captain Charles Howard Helsham, 5th Pioneer Battalion, Australian Imperial Force
Lieutenant-Colonel Frank le Leu Henley  Australian Army Service Corps
Major Reginald Mitchell Hore, Australian Army Veterinary Corps
Captain Sydney Arthur Hunn   32nd Battalion, Australian Imperial Force
Major Arthur Wellesley Hyman, 51st Battalion, Australian Imperial Force
Captain Samuel Barningham Lacey, Australian Army Service Corps
Captain Harry James Lane, Australian Army Service Corps
Major John Thomas McColl   40th Battalion, Australian Imperial Force
Major Alfred Fay Maclure, Australian Army Medical Corps
Major Frank Keith Officer   Australian General List
Captain Leslie Clive Parker, Australian General List
Major Charles Walter Robinson, Australian Army Service Corps

New Zealand Overseas Force
Captain Frank Lawton Hindley, Canterbury Mounted Rifles (New Zealand)
Major Frank Woolmer Parker, New Zealand Army Service Corps
Captain Richard Errol Wardell Riddiford   Wellington Regiment (New Zealand)
Major Louis Murray Shera  New Zealand Engineers

For valuable services rendered in connection with Military Operations in Egypt:
Temp Lieutenant James Richard Alderson, Royal Army Service Corps
Captain Vere Ayscott Bartrum, Royal Army Veterinary Corps
Captain Thomas Blackwood Beveridge, 5th Battalion, Argyll and Sutherland Highlanders
Temp Major Arthur Thomson Binney, Royal Army Service Corps
Captain Walter Boyle, Royal Engineers
Captain Rupert Briercliffe  Royal Army Medical Corps
Lieutenant Frank Bustard, 5th Battalion, Royal Lancaster Regiment
Temp Captain Francis Sam Butter, Royal Army Service Corps
Captain Roy Neil Boyd Campbell, 2nd Battalion, 23rd Sikh Pioneers (Indian Army)
Captain David Simpson Carson, 8th Battalion, Scottish Rifles
Temp Major or Lionel Melville Clark, Royal Army Service Corps
Lieutenant-Colonel Robert Leaver Clark  Royal Army Ordnance Corps
Temp Captain Gerald Leslie Makins Clouson, General List
Temp Major Arthur Annerley Corder  Royal Army Ordnance Corps
Rev. Felix Couturier   Royal Army Chaplains' Department
Captain and Brevet Major George Keeble Crichton   Royal Army Service Corps
Temp Captain William Henry Costhwaite, Special List
Lieutenant-Colonel Percy Henry Cunningham, Indian Army
Captain Wilfred John Dale, Royal Army Veterinary Corps
Major Percy Chandos Farquhar de Paravicini, Lincolnshire Yeomanry
Temp Major CamilleDes Clayes, Royal Army Service Corps
Temp Captain Frank Holt Diggle  Royal Army Medical Corps
Temp Captain Charles Frederick Draper, Royal Engineers
Captain Montagu Richard William Duberly, 1st Battalion, 23rd Sikhs Pioneers
Quartermaster and Captain Albert Edward Dunstan, Royal Army Service Corps
Major William Dyson  Royal Army Medical Corps
Major William Francis Ellis, Royal Army Medical Corps
Rev. James Charles Fitzgerald, Royal Army Chaplains' Department
Major Alexander Kempson Fletcher, Reserve of Officers
Temp Captain William Wood Forbes, Royal Army Medical Corps
Temp Captain Harold Arthur Fox, Royal Army Service Corps
Temp Captain Norman Stephen Gilchrist  Royal Army Medical Corps, attd. Royal Air Force
Lieutenant-Colonel James Godding  17th Battalion, London Regiment
Major Farquhar Gracie  Royal Army Medical Corps
Major Court Granville, 3rd (Reserve) Battalion, Devonshire Regiment, attd. 1st Garrison Battalion, Royal Warwickshire Regiment
Temp Captain Robert Windham Graves  Special List
Temp Major George Graydonald, Royal Engineers
Captain Hugh Manley Gregory, Royal Army Service Corps 
Local Captain Gabriel Haddad
Temp Lieutenant Reginald Cutler Haddon, Royal Army Service Corps
Captain Walter Johnston Halsey, 4th Battalion, Bedfordshire Regiment
Major John Edgar Hill, 5th Battalion, Bedfordshire Regiment
Captain Richardson Johnson Houghton, Cheshire Yeomanry
Captain Eustace Arnold How, 20th Battalion, Rifle Brigade
Temp Lieutenant John Francis Hubbard, Coldstream Guards and Special List
Captain John Inglis, Royal Army Medical Corps
Temp Captain Arthur Henry Jolliffe, Royal Engineers
Major Philip Welman Justice, Royal Garrison Artillery
Captain Thomas Fuller Kennedy  Royal Army Medical Corps
Temp Lieutenant Ernest Lake, Royal Engineers
Lieutenant-Colonel George Frederick Handel McDonald, Essex Regiment
Temp Major Mervyn Sorly MacDonnell, Special List
Major John William Mackenzie  Royal Army Medical Corps
Temp Captain Norman James Macowan, Royal Army Service Corps
Captain Lachlan Martin Victor Mitchell  Royal Army Medical Corps
Major Harry Francis Beauchamp Seymour Moore, Royal Engineers
Temp Lieutenant Oswald Facer Odell, Special List
Captain St. John Renwick Pigott, Irish Guards and Special List
Major Hugh Bateman Protheroe-Smith, 21st Lancers
Captain Charles John Ratcliff, Gloucestershire Hussars Yeomanry
Major William Ritchie, Royal Field Artillery
Captain Thomas Rodliffe, Royal Army Ordnance Corps
Local Lieutenant-Colonel Charles Frederick Ryder
Temp Lieutenant Robert Hamilton Scott  General List
Major Arthur William Woodman Simpson, Manchester Regiment
Temp Captain Charles William Smith  Royal Army Medical Corps
Temp Major Vincent Smith, Royal Army Service Corps
Captain Hubert Smithers, Royal West Kent Regiment
Lieutenant-Colonel George Elliot Frank Stammers, Royal Army Medical Corps
Captain Frederic Claude Stern   2nd County of London Yeomanry
Rev. John Featherstone Stirling, Royal Army Chaplains' Department
Temp Lieutenant Percy Wyfold Stout  General List
Lieutenant-Colonel William Benjamin Sudds, Royal Army Ordnance Corps
Temp Major Percy Joseph Ignatius Synnott, Special List, late Inniskilling Dragoons
Captain William Ironsides Tait, Suffolk Regiment, attd. Royal Engineers
Major Gerard Charles Taylor  Royal Army Medical Corps
Temp Major Ernest Tillard, Special List, attd. Royal Engineers 
Brevet Major Godfrey Ebenezer Tilly ard, Royal Army Veterinary Corps
Major Frederick Beaumont Treves  Royal Army Medical Corps
Temp Captain John Holmes Ure, Royal Engineers
Captain Phillip Sefton Vickorman  Royal Army Medical Corps (Special Reserve)
Captain Alexander Pirie Watson  Royal Army Medical Corps
Captain Russell Primrose Wells  15th Hussars, and Special List
Temp Captain Albert Williams, Special List
Rev. John Plumpton Wilson, Royal Army Chaplains' Department
Temp Captain Harold Woods, General List
Major Horace Leaf Wright, Northamptonshire Regiment

Australian Imperial Force
Lieutenant-Colonel Charles Bickerton Blackburn, Australian Army Medical Corps
Major Niel Hamilton Fairley, Australian Army Medical Corps
Lieutenant-Colonel Robert Fowler, Australian Army Medical Corps
Major John Henry Hammond, Australian Army Pay Corps
Major John Kendall, Australian Army Veterinary Corps
Lieutenant Colonel John Colvin Storey, Australian Army Medical Corps
Honorary Major John James Trictett, Australian Imperial Force Canteens
Rev. William Maitland Woods  Australian Army Chaplains' Department

Egyptian Army
El Miralai Ali Bay Shauki, Egyptian Army Reserve
El Bimbashi Mohammed Effendi Kamel Shalabi, 2nd Battalion, Egyptian Army

For services rendered in connection with Military Operations in Egypt:
Rev. Maurice Thomas Beckett, Royal Army Chaplains' Department
Captain Thomas Bone   Royal Army Veterinary Corps
Captain Frank Leader Brown, Royal Engineers
Lieutenant Vernon Brown, Northern Cyclist Battalion
Captain George Willis Browne, 4th Battalion, Royal Warwickshire Regiment
Temp Major Sir Richard Pierce Butler  Remount Department
Quartermaster and Major Thomas Clements, Durham Light Infantry
Temp Captain Christopher George Coates, Royal Army Service Corps
Temp Captain Edward Sinnott Coltman, Royal Army Service Corps
Captain Vere Egerton Cotton, Royal Field Artillery
Captain Sir Percy Francis Cunynghame  late 5th Battalion, Middlesex Regiment
Lieutenant Norman Dewhurst, Royal Army Service Corps
Captain William John Bales, 1/7th Battalion, Middlesex Regiment
Lieutenant William Eatherley, Royal Garrison Artillery
Captain David Howard Evans, 2nd Dragoon Guards
Major Arthur Kennet Hay  Royal Field Artillery
Captain John Sturgess Burrow Hill   1st Buckinghamshire Battalion, Oxfordshire & Buckinghamshire Light Infantry
Major Arthur Hippisley, Royal Garrison Artillery
Temp Major Henry Noel Hoare  Royal Army Service Corps
Temp Captain Harry Drake Hodgkinson, Royal Army Service Corps
Temp Captain Reginald Valentine Holmes, Royal Army Service Corps
Captain Thomas Douglas Inch  Royal Army Medical Corps
Temp Major Percy Sidney Inskipp, Royal Army Service Corps
Quartermaster and Major Bernard Frederick Jones, 1/7th Battalion, Royal Warwickshire Regiment
Temp Captain Gerald Francis Jones, Royal Engineers
Temp Captain Frank Limb, Royal Army Service Corps (M.T.)
Temp Captain Herbert William Longdin, Royal Engineers
Captain Frank Brigham Mitchell, 4th Battalion, East Lancashire Regiment
Temp Captain Patrick Moncreiff Murray  General List
Temp Major Cornelius William Myddleton, Royal Engineers
Major Frank Herbert Norbury, Royal Army Service Corps
Major Herbert Charles Owen   5th (Reserve) Battalion, The Middlesex Regiment
Captain Andrew Picken  Royal Army Medical Corps
Temp Major Wilfred Harry Pryce, Special List
Temp Captain Herbert James Ratcliffe, General List
Temp Major Richard Cooke Ridley, Royal Army Service Corps
Major Arthur Henry Roberts  Royal Army Service Corps
Temp Major Ernest Albert Rose, Royal Army Service Corps
Temp Major DennisSpurling, Royal Field Artillery
Temp Captain Dickinson Starkey, Royal Army Veterinary Corps
Captain William Stothert, Royal Army Veterinary Corps
Major Cuthbert Gambier Ryves Sydney-Turner  Royal Army Service Corps
Temp Captain William John Tipping, General List
Captain John Charles Tribe, Royal Garrison Artillery, attd. Royal Army Ordnance Corps
Major Charles Jerome Vaughan, Royal Engineers
Major Philip Henry Norris Nugent Vyvyan   Royal Army Service Corps
Captain Joseph Douglas Wells  Royal Army Medical Corps
Temp Major Douglas Wood, General List

For valuable services rendered in connection with Military Operations in Salonika:
Quartermaster and Major William Murray Allan, 2nd Battalion, Northumberland Fusiliers
Temp Captain David Irving Anderson  Royal Army Medical Corps
Temp Captain James Connor Maxwell Bailey  Royal Army Medical Corps
Temp Captain George Victor Bakewell  Royal Army Medical Corps
Captain Francis Brock Barker, Royal Engineers
Captain Thomas Yuille Barkley  Royal Army Medical Corps
Lieutenant-Colonel Michael Biddulph, Army Pay Department
Temp Major Alfre de Granville Birch, Royal Army Service Corps
Quartermaster and Captain Edgar Charles Boulter, Royal Army Service Corps
Lieutenant-Colonel Michael Boyle  Royal Army Medical Corps
Temp Major Warwick Wellington Briggs, Royal Army Service Corps
Temp Captain Robert Francis Bryant, Royal Army Service Corps
Temp Major Harold Tullis Chambers, Royal Army Service Corps
Temp Captain Amos Hubert Coleman  Royal Army Medical Corps
Temp Captain Paul Eugene Cremetti, General List
Temp Captain Joseph Edward Davies, Royal Army Service Corps
Temp Captain James Anthony Delmege, Royal Army Medical Corps
Temp Captain Charles Esmond de Wolff, Royal Army Ordnance Corps
Captain Archibald Hamilton James Douglas-Campbell, 4th Battalion, Argyll and Sutherland Highlanders
Temp Captain Frederick Habler Downie, 23rd Battalion, Welsh Regiment
Temp Captain William Burton Elwes, Royal Engineers
Temp Captain Robert Richard Elworthy  Royal Army Medical Corps
Temp Captain William Archdall Ffooks, General List 
Brevet Major Geoffrey Nigel FitzJohn, Worcestershire Regiment
Captain Walter Barham Foley  Royal Army Medical Corps
Temp Major or Charles Horace Fox, Royal Engineers
Major William Rickards Galwey  Royal Army Medical Corps
Rev. Thomas Vernon Garnier, Royal Army Chaplains' Department
Temp Captain Harold Elsdale Goad, Special List
Major John Gray, Royal Army Medical Corps
Major Walter Lewis Harrison  Royal Army Veterinary Corps
Lieutenant-Colonel John Edward Hodgson, Royal Army Medical Corps
Rev. John Oliver Hornabrook, Royal Army Chaplains' Department
Temp Captain Oswald Egerton Orme Jackson, General List
Temp Captain Daniel Judson, General List
Temp Captain Edward Kidson, Royal Engineers
Temp Major or James Cornyn Lewis Knight-Bruce, Special List
Temp Captain Langlois Massey Lefroy, General List
Captain Hugh Ernest McColl  Royal Army Medical Corps
Lieutenant-Colonel Peter Mitchell  Royal Army Medical Corps
Temp Captain George Moir, Royal Army Veterinary Corps
Captain Francis Edward Orange-Bromehead, Royal Engineers
Temp Captain John Elliott Paddey, Royal Engineers
Temp Lieutenant-Colonel John Bardsley Parkhouse, General List
Temp Lieutenant Temp Major Stanley Ernest Parkhouse, Royal Engineers
Captain William Jackson Perkins   5th Battalion, Royal West Surrey Regiment
Rev. Albert Bertrand Purdie, Royal Army Chaplains' Department
Temp Captain Walter Nevelle Scholes, Royal Engineers
Temp Major Leslie Shingleton, Royal Engineers
Temp Captain Arthur William Smith, Royal Garrison Artillery
Lieutenant-Colonel Oscar Striedinger  Royal Army Service Corps
Captain Julian Taylor  Royal Army Medical Corps 
Captain William Henry McNeile Verschoyle Campbell   Royal Army Ordnance Corps
Lieutenant Charles Walter Villiers  Coldstream Guards
Major Charles Bishqp Walker, Royal Army Service Corps
Lieutenant-Colonel Frederick Edward Apthorpe Webb, Royal Army Medical Corps
Rev. Howard Melville Webb-Peploe, Royal Army Chaplains' Department
Temp Major Evelyn Valentine Wellings, Royal Army Service Corps
Captain Edward Lycett Wheelwright, 3rd (Reserve), attd. 1st Battalion, Yorkshire Light Infantry
Captain Reginald Maitland Wilson, Cheshire Yeomanry
Temp Major Philip Humphrey Wyatt, Royal Army Service Corps

For valuable services rendered in connection with Military Operations in North Russia:
Temp Captain F. Chambers, Royal Army Veterinary Corps
Captain Ralph Chenevix-Trench   Royal Engineers
Temp Lieutenant A. W. Kearn, Royal Army Ordnance Corps
Captain G. Steele, Northamptonshire Yeomanry
Temp Major Ralph Shenton Griffin Stokes  Royal Engineers

Royal Air Force

Major Charles Francis Abell
Major George Henry Abell
Captain Reginald Addenbrooke-Prout 
Captain George Charlton Anne
Major Felton Clayson Atkinson
Major Harold Gordon Atkinson
Captain Henry Fox Atkinson-Clark
Major Herbert Arthur Reginald Aubrey 
Captain Lawrence Auker
Captain Sidney Robert Axford
Captain William Edgar Aylwin 
Captain Lionel Percy Ball
Captain Aiden James Wharton Barmby
Captain Allen Stewart Barnfield
Major Robert John Fergusois Barton
Captain Thomas George Baxenden
Major John George Bayes
Major Victor Douglas Bell
Lieutenant-Colonel Bertram Richard White Beor
Lieutenant-Colonel Edward Gerald Oakley Beuttler
Major Henry Francis Tozer Blowey
Lieutenant-Colonel Ian Malcolm Bonham-Carter
Captain Claude Herbert Dick Bonnett
Lieutenant-Colonel James Bevan Bowen
Lieutenant-Colonel Geoffrey Rhodes Bromet 
Captain Francis Giles Brown
Major Thomas Bullen
Captain William Douglas Budgen
Captain Christopher Llewellyn Bullock
Captain Cyril Gordon Burge
Captain John Wotherspoon Burt
Major Horace Austin Buss 
Major Charles Adrian James Butter
Major Donald Hay Cameron
Lieutenant-Colonel Edward Oliver Bamford Carbery 
Major Rowland Dobree Carey
Major Silas Bernard Foley Carter
Major Frederick Foster Chambers
Major Ronald Cockburn
Major Reginald Blayney Bulteel Colmore
Lieutenant-Colonel Daniel Goodwin Conner
Captain Robert Ewing-Cook
Major Ion Alexander Scott Cooke
Major James Percy Carre Cooper 
Honorary Major Herbert John Corin, L.D.S., R.C.S
Lieutenant-Colonel Jasper Wallace Cruickshank
Captain Howard Cumming
Captain Walter John Brice Curtis
Major Walford Davies
Major Francis Robert Edward Davis
Captain Harold Bentley Denton
Major Rene de Sarigny,  South African Forces
Lieutenant-Colonel Francis Richard Drake
Major Chester Stairs Duffus 
Lieutenant-Colonel John Dunville
Captain Percy Granville Edge 
Lieutenant-Colonel Charles Humphrey Kingsman Edmonds 
Captain Thomas Macdonald Eggar
Captain James Boyne Elliott
Major Stuart Oswald Everitt
Captain William Walter Farthing
Lieutenant-Colonel Louis Frederick Rudston Fell 
Major William James Fernie
Lieutenant-Colonel Cecil Fraser 
Captain Francis William Ian Victor Fraser 
Lieutenant-Colonel George William Frederick Fraser
Major Max Freeman
Major Charles William Gamble 
Major Thomas Richard Henty Garrett
Acting Major William Walker Gibson 
Major Thomas Edward Gilmore
Major Stanley James Goble 
Lieutenant-Colonel Norman Goldsmith
Captain Cedric Foskett Gordon 
Captain Frank James Gray
Captain The Honourable Lionel George William Guest
Major Alfred Kingsley Hall
Captain Ernest Samuel Halford
Captain William Stanley Hammond
Major George Daniel Hannay
Captain John Frederick Hawkins
Major Robert Cholerton Hayes
Major George Hazelton
Major Alfred Stanley Hellawell
Captain Richard Gustavus Heyn
Major John Harris Hills 
Major Robert Hilton-Jones
Captain William Hodgson
Captain Ernest Holloway
Major Ernest James Howard
Major Ernest Henry Johnston
Major Frank Jolly
Major Stuart Samuel Kennedy
Major Charles Frederick Krabbe 
Captain Clarence Brehmer Krabbe
Major George Laing
Captain James Arthur Maule Lang
Lieutenant-Colonel William Henry Lang
Major Henry Charles Theodore Langdon
Major Frederick Charles Victor Laws
Captain Harold Roger Lecomber
Lieutenant-Colonel Cecil John l'Estrange-Malone
Captain Leonard Moore Lilley
Captain Reginald Stuart Lindsell
Major John William Lantott
Captain Philip Norman Logan
Major Walter Dixon Long
Captain Theodore Ernie Longridge
Major Frederick William Lucas
Major Thomas Lyons 
Captain George Buchanan McClure
Captain Samuel McClure
Major James Ronald McCrindle 
Captain Colin Temple McLaren
Major William Lockwood Marsh
Captain Reginald Ferdinando Maitland
Major Alfred Ridley Martin
Captain Thomas Martin
Captain Richard Beauchamp Maycock
Lieutenant-Colonel Arthur Harold Measures
Major Charles Edward Hastings Medhurst 
Captain Edward Patrick Alexander Melville
Lieutenant-Colonel Malcolm David Methven
Major William Charles Michie
Major Arnold John Miley 
Lieutenant-Colonel Robert Harry Mornement
Major Alfred Samuel Morris
Major Roland James Mounsey
Major Charles Joseph Murfitt
Major Percy Murray John Murrell
Captain Douglas Gordon Nairn
Major Stanley Sharp Nevill
Captain Norman Dakeyne Newall
Captain Leslie Newman
Major Herbert John Newton-Clare
Major Francis Arthur Gerard Noel
Captain John Tom North
Major Harry Robert Northoyer 
Major Charles Percy Ogden
Major Brefney Rolph O'Reilly  Canadian Local Forces
Captain Henry William Moncrieff Paul 
Major Gerald Selwyn Peacock
Captain Joseph Pearce
Captain Eugene Courtney Perrin
Lieutenant-Colonel Thomas Brocklehurst Phillips, late 13th Hussars, and formerly attached Air Board
Major Geoffrey Denzie Pidgeon
Major Robert Kingsley Pillers
Major William Joseph Polyblank
Major Enoch Powell
Lieutenant-Colonel George Frederick Pretyman 
Major Charles Edmond Prince 
Major Con way Walker Heath Pulford
Captain Frederick Bygrave Pulham
Captain Stamford Cecil Raffles
Captain William Oswald Raikes 
Major Donald Rainsford-Hannay
Major George Martin Treherne Rees
Captain Robert Alburne Reid
Major Vincent Crane Richmond
Major Thomas Edward Robertson
Major Alexander Augustus Edmund Robinson
Major Alick Christopher Robinson
Captain John Rubie
Major William John Ryan 
Lieutenant-Colonel Leslie Sadler
Major Frederick Lewellen Scholte
Lieutenant-Colonel Francis Claude Shelmerdine
Major the Right Honourable Sir John Allsebrook Simon  
Captain Gerald Arthur Sinclair-Hill
Major Sidney Vincent Sippe 
Major Charles Gainer Smith
Lieutenant-Colonel Sidney Ernest Smith
Major John Trevor Spittle
Captain Frederick Gunning Stammers
Captain Edward Parker Stapleton
Lieutenant-Colonel John Starling
Major Ernest Walker Stedman
Major Alfred Horace Steele Steele-Perkins
Major Frank Harold Stephens, Medical Service
Major Edward Stokes
Major Arthur Struben, South African Engineers
Major Bertine Entwistle Sutton 
Captain Otho Vincent Thomas
Captain Rudall Woodliffe Thomas
Acting Major John Edmund Burnet Thornely
Captain Francis William Trott 
Major Arthur Kellam Tylee
Captain Anthony Herbert William Wall 
Captain Vere Ward-Brown 
Major Francis Cartwright Williams
Major Richard Williams  Australian Flying Corps
Captain Frank Gordon Wilson
Major Francis Augustus John Bartholomew Wiseman
Captain Murdick McKenzie Wood
Captain Gilbert de Lacy Wooldridge
Major Harold Wyllie
Major Alfred Hearst Wynn Elias Wynn
Captain Walter Gerald Paul Young

Women's Royal Air Force
Assistant Commandant, Class I Winifred Powell
Assistant Commandant, Class II Mary Edwards
Assistant Commandant, Class II Margaret Moss

Indian Army
Lieutenant-Colonel Richard Carmichael Bell  38th Central Indian Horse
Major Charles Edward Bruce, Indian Army, Political Department, late Political Officer, Mari Punitive Force, Baluchistan
Brevet Colonel James William Cowey, late Indian Army
Lieutenant-Colonel Robert Henry Dewing, late Indian Army
2nd Lieutenant Frederick Wingfield Douglas, Labour Corps and Indian Army Reserve of Officers
Captain John Charles Gammon, General List and Indian Army Reserve of Officers
Captain David Livingstone Graham  Indian Medical Service
Major John Kendall, late Indian Army
Major Frederick James Sharpies Lowry, Indian Army
Temp Lieutenant Kaikobad Rustony Madan, Indian Medical Service
Colonel Ambrose William Newbold, Indian Army
Lieutenant-Colonel Hugh Frederick Archie Pearson, 1st Battalion, 23rd Sikh Pioneers (Indian Army)
Captain Rupert Simson, retired, Indian Army
Major Ralph Henry Hammersley-Smith, 14th Lancers, Indian Army
Lieutenant-Colonel and Brevet Colonel Henry Templer, Indian Army

Civil Division
Mary Rothes Margaret, Baroness Amherst of Hackney, Chief of the Rural Section, National Salvage Department
Alexander Colin Anderson, For services with the British Expeditionary Force in Russia
Maurice Fitzgerald Anderson, Assistant Sub-Commissioner, Trade Exemptions, Scottish Region, Ministry of National Service
Captain Sydney James Hounsell Angel, Master of the Transport Australind
Francis Joseph Armstrong, Senior Clerk, Scottish Education Department, Edinburgh; Secretary to Departmental Committee on Remuneration of Teachers
Captain Percy Harland Atkin, Secretary, Military Service Committee, Scottish Education Department, London
Harold Cholmley Mansfield Austen, Superintending Engineer, Department of Engineering, Ministry of Munitions
William Rebotier Aveline, Chief Engineer, Asiatic Petroleum Company Limited
James Black Baillie  Professor of Philosophy, Aberdeen University
William David Barber  Civil Assistant to Hydrographer, Admiralty
Mabel Emily Barber, Lady Superintendent, H.R.H. Princess Victoria's Best Club, St. Omer
Thomas James Barnes, Temporary Legal Assistant, Ministry of Shipping
Barclay Baron, in charge of Fourth Army Area Centres, Y.M.C.A. 
Richard Dawson Bates, Honorary Secretary, Graigavon Hospital for Neurasthenics
The Reverend Basil Staunton Batty, Chairman, London Diocesan Committee for work in Munition Centres
Agneta Frances Beauchamp, Manager, Red Cross Refreshment Station, Salonika
Lieutenant-Colonel Charles Thornhill Bell, Assistant Inspector, Trench Warfare Stores, Ministry of Munitions
Arthur Henry Bennett, Executive Officer, Borough of Leicester Food Control Committee
Ethel Van Bergen, Commandant and Donor of Auxiliary Hospital, Attingham, Shrewsbury
Ethel Jean Bevan, Honorary Secretary, Stoke Newington and Hackney Local War Pensions Sub-Committee
Edith Lindsay, Lady Selby-Bigge, Organiser of Y.W.C.A. Munition Girls' Canteens and Hostels
Harold William Meares Binney, Chief Commissariat Officer and Deputy Director, Middlesex Branch, Joint V.A. Organisation, British Red Cross and Order of St. John
Matthew Stevenson Birkett, Assistant Controller, General Statistical Branch, Ministry of Munitions
Pearl Hall Bishop, Organiser and Commandant, Oakden Auxiliary Hospital and Annexe, Rainhill, West Lancashire
Owen Vincent Blake, Chief Accountant, Foreign Office and Ministry of Blockade
Captain Stanley Blythen, Deputy Controller, Registration, East Midland Region, Ministry of National Service
Alfred Watson Booth, Managing Director, Messrs. J. Booth & Sons, Rodley, Leeds
Albert William Borthwick  Forestry Advisory Officer, Board of Agriculture for Scotland
George Menteth Boughey, Principal Clerk, Medical Services Division, Ministry of Pensions
Captain Henry Frank Bourdeaux, Assistant Submarine Superintendent, Post Office, Engineering Department
William Korff Bowen, Trinity House
Mary, Lady Bradford, Lady Helper, Surgical Divisions, Nos. 24 and 26 General Hospitals, British Expeditionary Force
Edward Murray Brand, Paymaster, Royal Arsenal, Woolwich
The Honourable Maude Helena Brassey, Vice-President, Oxfordshire Branch of the British Red Cross Society, and Donor and Commandant of the Chipping Norton Auxiliary Hospital
The Reverend Edwin James Brechin, Late General Superintendent for France, Scottish Churches Huts
Edgcumbe Bendle Brighten, Director of Printing, Ministry of Food
Edith Broadmead, County of Somerset Voluntary Help Association
The Honorable Diana Isabel Brougham, Staff Commandant and Assistant Head of Military Department, Joint Women's Voluntary Aid Detachment, Department, British Red Cross and Order of St. John
Marion Bruce, Registrar and Organiser of Timberhurst Auxiliary Hospital, Bury, East Lancashire
Major Henry du Buisson, Old Comrades Association, British Red Cross Society
Ralph Bullock  Divisional Commander, Metropolitan Special Constabulary
Major George Purvis Bulman, Deputy Chief Inspector (Engines), Aircraft Inspection Department, Ministry of Munitions
Christiana Mary Burchardt, County Secretary, Oxfordshire Branch, British Red Cross Society
The Honourable Emily Dunbar Burns
Percy Dale Bussell, Acting Assistant Director of Navy Contracts, Admiralty
Frances Mary Buxton, Wounded and Missing Enquiry Department, British Red Cross Society
Margaret Dorothy Byron, Commandant of the Women's Detachment of the London Ambulance Column, City of London Branch, British Red Cross Society
Laurence John Cadbury, Officer in Charge of Transport, Friends' Ambulance Unit, Dunkirk, France
Reginald Colin Calder, Establishment Offices, Ministry of Information
Archibald Charles Campbell, Vice-Chairman of the British Chamber of Commerce, Genoa; Member of the Patriotic League of Britons Overseas
Mary Gertrude Campion, Commandant of Voluntary Aid Detachments, Rouen Area, France
Mabel Barclay, Lady Cantlie, Red Cross Organiser, Division of Marylebone, County of London Branch, British Red Cross Society
Thomas Henry Towler Case, Treasury Solicitor's Department
Kenneth Edlmann Chalmers, Vice-Chairman, Kent Local War Pensions Committee
George Tanner Chivers, Head Master, Dockyard School, Portsmouth
Harold Thomas Clarke, Head of Statistical Section, Commercial Branch, Ministry of Shipping
Edith Maud Cliff, Commandant, Gledhow Hall Auxiliary Hospital, Leeds
Major Lewis St. John Rawlinson Clutterbuck, Inspector, Technical Division of Filled and Empty Shell, Woolwich Arsenal
Blair Onslow Cochrane, County Director, Auxiliary Hospitals and Voluntary Aid Detachments, Isle of Wight
William Henry Cockeram, Principal District Officer, Board of Trade Survey Staff
Albert Edward Cocks, Naval Store Officer, H.M. Dockyard, Devonport
Arthur William Codd, Chief Cartographer, Hydrographic Department, Admiralty
Harold William Cole  Executive Officer, Road Transport Board
Charles Henry Colson, Superintending Civil Engineer, Civil Engineer in Chief's Department, Admiralty
Cornelius Combridge  Chairman of Birmingham War Savings Committee
Kenneth Cookson, Commandant, British Red Cross Motor Ambulance, Convoy No. 3, Italy
Charlotte Leonora, Lady Cooper, Commandant of City of London Voluntary Aid Detachment No. 10
Percy Fullerton Corkhill, Secretary to the Lord Mayor of Liverpool
Richard Corless, Superintendent of Instruments, Meteorological Office
Frederick Costello, Chairman of Hull Local Food Control Committee
Reginald Sydney Courtney, Deputy Director of Purchases, British War Mission in U.S.A.
Lieutenant Aedan Cox, Secretary to the Irish Recruiting Council
George Cribbes, Proprietor, Beaver Hall Works
Maxwell Arthur Crosbie, Head of Machinery Department, Messrs. Boots & Company
Cuthbert Crowley, Secretary, Kitchener House Club for Wounded Soldiers and Sailors, British Red Cross Society
William Crowther  Chairman of the Employers' Federation for the Woollen Trade
Zella Evelyn Leather Culley, Vice-President, Alnwick Division, Northumberland Branch, British Red Cross Society
Thomas Curr, Engineer and Manager, South Metropolitan Gas Company
Major Phillip Arthur Curry, Director of Embarkation Department, New York Office, Ministry of Shipping
Mabel Jane Cutbush, Organiser and Commandant, Rosslyn-Auxiliary Hospital, Hampstead
Maud Anne David, Honorary Secretary, Cardiff Division', Soldiers' and Sailors' Families Association
George Davidson, Genoa
Edwin Harold Davies, General Distribution Branch, Coal Mines Department, Board of Trade
Thomas Davies, Managing Director, Messrs. T. Davies and Sons Limited
Florence Mary Davis, Nurses' Department, British Red Cross Society
Captain Kenneth Randall Davis, Secretary, Birmingham Small Arms Company Limited
Francis Herbert Mountjoy Nelson Humphrey-Davy, British War Mission in U.S.A.
Marion Disraeli, Vice-President of the Wycombe and Desborough Division, Buckinghamshire Branch, British Red Cross Society
Colonel George Cadell Dobbs, Honorary Secretary, Irish Branch, Incorporated Soldiers' and Sailors' Help Society 
Robert Doncaster  Chairman, Shardlow Rural District Council
Lieutenant-Commander Charles Edward Down  Master, Mercantile Marine; Marine-Superintendent, Royal Mail Steam Packet Company
William Henry Milverton Drake, Secretary, Headquarters Y.M.C.A., Workers' Department
James Dunn Dunn, Commercial Assistant, Ministry of Shipping
Nora Kathleen Durler, Joint Commandant, Wardown Auxiliary Hospital, Luton
William Pelham Eastham, District Superintendent;, Trinity House, London
William Stanley Edmonds  For services to the Egyptian Expeditionary Force
George Edwards  Vice-President, National Agricultural Labourers' and Rural Workers' Union; Workers' Representative on the Agricultural Wages Board; Member of the Norfolk District Wages Committee
Archibald Sefton Elford  Temporary Assistant, Military Sea Transport Branch, Ministry of Shipping
Alexander Macbeth Elliot  Headquarters Medical Examiner, British Red Cross Society
Major-General Philip Mackay Ellis, County Director, Auxiliary Hospitals and Voluntary Aid Detachments, Carnarvonshire
Minnie Enness, Red Cross Work, Egypt
James Johnstone Esplen, Director, Technical Department, British Ministry of Shipping in U.S.A.
George Hammond Etherton, Town Clerk, Portsmouth; Executive Officer, Portsmouth Food Control Committee
John Taylor Ewen, H.M. Inspector of Schools; Secretary, Aberdeen Munitions Board of Management
Flora Emily Fardell, Honorary Secretary, Education Committee, Officers' Families Fund
Hugh Richard Farren  Chairman, Coventry Local War Pensions Committee
Alfred Cornwall Ferguson  Commandant and Medical Officer, Thirsk Auxiliary Hospital, Yorkshire
Engineer-Commander Anthony Ferguson  Chief Engineer of the Transport Olympic
Louis Ferguson, Senior Partner and Managing Director, Messrs. Ferguson Bros., Ltd., Port Glasgow
William Fife, Senior Partner, Messrs. W. Fife & Sons
David John Finlayson  Chief Accountant, British Red Cross Society
George Edgar Foot, Superintending Clerk, Accountant General's Department, Admiralty
Arthur Charles Forbes, Chief Forestry Inspector, Department of Agriculture and Technical Instruction for Ireland; Assistant Controller of Timber Supplies for Ireland
Colonel Everard Allen Ford, Founder and Commandant, London Diocesan Church Lads' Brigade
John James Forster, Carlisle Citizens' League, British Red Cross Society
Robert John Foster, Local Director, Peterborough Flax Centre, Board of Agriculture and Fisheries
Margaret Mary Maitland Fowler, Vice-President, Atherstone Division, Warwickshire Branch, British Red Cross Society; Commandant, Weddington Hall Auxiliary Hospital
Florence Fraser, Commandant, Massandra Auxiliary Hospital, Weymouth
Hamilton Fulton, Managing Director, Messrs. Martinsyde, Limited
Henry John Edward Garcia  Superintending Inspector of Taxes, Inland Revenue
William George, Town Clerk, Invergordon
Henry Gibbs, Technical Wool Officer, War Office
Charles Stanley Gibson, Adviser, Chemical Warfare Department, Ministry of Munitions
Edwin Gillett, Principal Clerk, Legal Department, Board of Trade
Thomas Richard Gleghorn, Secretary, Central Iron Ore Committee, Ministry of Munitions
Edward Goldsmith  Divisional Commander, Metropolitan Special Constabulary
Alfred Gollin  Divisional Commander, Metropolitan Special Constabulary
John Good, Assistant Controller, Gun Ammunition Manufacture Department, Ministry of Munitions
Clarence Noel Goodall, Managing Director, Messrs. Robert Stephenson & Co., Ltd.
The Honourable Henrietta Margaret Goodenough, Soldiers' and Sailors' Families' Association, Soldiers' and Sailors' Help Society, and Royal Patriotic Fund, Portsmouth
Robert Vaughan Gower  Mayor of Tunbridge Wells
Mary Bremner Graham, Borough of Scarborough Association of Voluntary Workers
Olivia Mary Greer, Organiser of Red Cross Work Rooms, Dublin; late Commandant of Lady Dudley's Hospital for Officers, Bournemouth
John Temperley Grey  Donor and Medical Officer, Stanmore House Auxiliary Hospital, Lenham
Lieutenant-Colonel James Grimwood  Acting Principal Clerk, War Office
Catherine Gurney, Founder of the International Christian Police Association, and of Convalescent Homes and Orphanages for Police at Brighton, Redhill, and Harrogate
George Francis Hambly, Deputy Assistant Director of Army Contracts
John James William Handford, Assistant Secretary and Chief Accountant, Board of Agriculture for Scotland
John Rudge Harding, Secretary, Auxiliary Home Hospitals Department, British Red Cross Society
Arthur Hobson Hardisty, Member of Huddeirsfield Board of Management; General Manager and Honorary Secretary of a National Shell Factory
Henry Harrison  Area Recruiting Organiser in Ireland
David Allan Hay, Honorary Secretary, Glasgow Branch, Soldiers' and Sailors' Families Association
Frederick William Hayne, Chairman of the Central Committee of the Overseas Club; Founder of the Patriotic League of Britons Overseas
Mary Elizabeth Hedley, Vice-President, North Riding of Yorkshire Branch, British Red Cross Society; Administrator and Donor of Hospital at Middlesbrough
Eveleen Mary Henderson, Vice-President of Leatherhead Division, Surrey Branch, British Red Cross Society; Commandant of Red House Auxiliary Hospital, Surrey
Henry Leslie Hendriks, Chief Staff Officer, City of London Police Special Reserve
Alice Helen Henry, Organiser and Head of Sphagnum Moss Department, Irish War Hospital Supply Depot, British Red Cross Society
Elliot Dunville Hewan, Director, Oil Department, New York Office
William Hibberdine, Traffic Manager, Eastern Telegraph Company
Mary Hiley, Commandant, Sleaford Auxiliary Hospital, South Lincolnshire
Edith Cairns Hindley, Organising Area Secretary for Y.W.C.A. in Boulogne Area
Captain Lewis Hoad, Master of Cable Ship, Telconia
Walter Edward Hobbs, Controller of Supplies, Ministry of National Service
Gideon Hobden, Manager of Jack's Palace, British and Foreign Sailors' Society
Edward Highton Hodgson, Committee Clerk, Customs and Excise
John Ewer Jefferson Hogg  Assistant Director of National Service, West London and District Area
Robert Wolstenholme Holland  Honorary Civil Liabilities Commissioner, Monmouthshire
Frederick Holt, Chemist, The Castner-Kellner Alkali Company Limited
Frances Jane, Lady Homer, Organiser of Y.M.C.A. Munitions Canteens in North London
Ernest Charles Horton, President of the Home Timber Section of the Timber Federation; Member of Advisory Committee to Timber Controller
Charles Marshall Hourston, Assistant Controller, Factory Audit and Costs Department, Ministry of Munitions
Agnes Maud Hulme, Lady Superintendent, H.R.H. Princess Victoria's Rest Club, Calais
John Herbert Hunt, District Secretary, Y.M.C.A., First Army Area
Bertha Huth, for services to the Incorporated Soldiers and Sailors Help Society
Katharine Anne Hyde, Donor and Commandant, Wharmton Towers Auxiliary Hospital, Greenfield, Yorkshire
Mariette Isaacs, Commandant of Queen's Gate Auxiliary Hospital, London
John Hier Jacob, Acting Principal Clerk, Public Trustee Office
Frederick Ernest James, District Secretary, Y.M.C.A., Abbeville
Mary Johnson, Hull and East Riding of Yorkshire Association of Voluntary Workers
Robert William Johnstone  Commissioner of Medical Services, Ministry of National Service
Ernest Stephens Jones, Actuary to Pensions Commutation Board
Samuel Glynne Jones, Assistant Inspector, Board of Education
Henry Joy, Assistant Controller, Post Office Savings Bank Department
Mary Lees Kay, Vice-President of the Middlewich Division, Cheshire Branch, British Red Cross Society; Administrator, Brunner Mond Club Hospital, Middlewich
Reginald Heber Keatinge, Honorary Secretary, "Our Day," Ireland
William Foord-Kelcey, Professor of Mathematics and Mechanics, Royal Military Academy
William Thomas Kendall, Chief Engineer of the Transport Khiva
John Macfarlane Kennedy, Superintendent, Government Rolling Mills, Ministry of Munitions
Martha Kerr, Lady Superintendent, Y.M.C.A. Naval Institute, Rosyth
Muriel Constance Kerr, Stores Headquarters Staff, British Red Cross Society
Augustus Charles Edmund Kimber
Alice Cicell King, Commandant, New Court Auxiliary Hospital, Cheltenham
Henry Smails King  Assistant Army Auditor, Egyptian Expeditionary Force
William Frederick King, Assistant Controller, Munitions Accounts, Ministry of Munitions
Ethel Corbet Knight, Organising Secretary in France for Y.W.C.A. Recreation Huts
Christine Knowles, British Prisoners of War Food Parcels and Clothing Fund, British Red Cross Society
Manouk Kouyoumdjian, Late British Consular Agent, Philippopolis
Annie Macpherson Laurie, Vice-President, Weymouth Division, Dorsetshire Branch, British Red Cross Society
Samuel Chetwynd Leech, Civil Liabilities Commissioner for Camberwell
Luciert Alphonse Legros, Chief Technical Assistant, Dilution Section, Ministry of National Service
Colonel Henry Lewis  
John Lewis, Chief Engineer, Mercantile Marine
Margaret Blanche Lewis, Senior Organising Officer, Employment Department, Ministry of Labour
Colonel Charles Linton, County Director, Auxiliary Hospitals and Voluntary Aid Detachments, Huntingdonshire
William Locke, Clerk in Charge of Accounts, H.M. Office of Works
Frederick Charles Lohden, Standard Ship Branch, Ministry of Shipping
Lieutenant Edward Ernest Long, Deputy Controller, Oriental Department, Ministry of Information
Lieutenant-Colonel Llewellyn Wood Longstaff, Vice-President and Assistant County Director, Wimbledon Division, Surrey Branch, British Red Cross Society (to date from 1 November 1918)
Mary Sophia Loudon, Joint Commandant, Christchurch Auxiliary Hospital, Hampshire
John Reuben Lunn  Commandant, "The Cecils" Auxiliary Hospital Chappell Croft, Sussex
Mary Fownes Luttrell, Vice-President, Williton, District, Somersetshire Branch, British Red Cross Society; Organiser of Red Cross Hospital, Minehead, Somersetshire
Hugh Allan Macewen  Medical Inspector, Local Government Board
James Colquhoun Macfarlane, Manager, Howitzer Shop, Messrs. Wm Beardmore & Co., Ltd.
Lauchlan Grant McFarlane, Assistant Manager, Messrs. Cammell, Laird & Company, Birkenhead
Malcolm Macfarlane, Assistant Director of Finance, Ministry of Food
Margaret Annie Kay McGrigor, Vice-President, Stirlingshire Branch, Scottish Branch, British Red Cross Society
The Honourable Robert Donald McKenzie, Wounded and Missing Enquiry Department, Havre, British Red Cross Society
Captain John Reid McLean  Divisional Commander, Metropolitan Special Constabulary
James Hamish MacMurray, Manager, Imperial Bank of Persia, Hamadan
Major Wallace John McNab, Purchasing Department, British War Mission in U.S.A.
Robert Henry Maconochie, Recruiting Department, Ministry of National Service
Captain James Macoun, Chief Executive Officer, Irish Food Control Committee
Captain Douglas Ross Macphail, Assistant Director of Contracts, Royal Commission on Wheat Supplies
Thomas MacPherson, Local Purchasing Officer, Egyptian Expeditionary Force
Frances Helen Macqueen, Honorary Secretary, Aberdeen War Dressings Depot
Elsie Trant MacSwinney, Staff Commandant, Motor and Training Departments, Joint Women's Voluntary Aid Detachment, Department, British Red Cross and Order of St. John
Kate Manley, Woman Inspector of Domestic Subjects under the Board of Education; Organiser of National Kitchens
Edith Lindsay Manning, Head of Surgical Department, Queen Mary's Needlework Guild
Edmund George Marlow, Assistant Controller, Munitions Accounts, Ministry of Munitions
Alan Herbert Marquand, Head of the Liner Shipment Section, Commercial Branch, Ministry of Shipping
Philip Edward Marrack, Assistant Principal, Secretary's Department, Admiralty
Captain Arthur Timothy Marshall, Assistant Secretary, Department of Controller-General of Merchant Shipbuilding, Admiralty
William Lee Marshall, Member of Special Grants Committee, Ministry of Pensions
Dudley Christopher Maynard, Architect of the Queen's Auxiliary Hospital, Frognal, Foot's Cray, Kent
Olga Mosley Mayne, Worker in the Soldiers' Club at Arquata, Italy
Major Robert Hobart Mayo, Section Director, Aircraft Technical Department, Ministry of Munitions
Henry Arthur Measor, Trinity House
Benjamin Measures  Farmer
Frederick Alan Van der Meulen, Finance Department, War Office
William Aberdein Middleton, Inspector of Audit, Insurance Audit Department
William Miles, Section Director, Agricultural Machinery Department, Ministry of Munitions 
Ellen Cameron Miller, Red Cross Work, Egypt
Irene Helen Miller, Vice-President, Rugby Division, Warwickshire Branch, British Red Cross Society
George Torrance Milne, Trade Commissioner
Albert Ernest Mitchell, Accounting Officer and Chief Clerk, Central Control Board (Liquor Traffic)
William Henry Morgan, Director of Stores Department, Order of St. John of Jerusalem in England
Captain William Roger Morison, Master of the Transport Princess Victoria
Cynthia Gertrude Morris, The Rifle Brigade Prisoners of War Fund
Miriam Louise Moseley, Honorary Secretary, Radnorshire Association of Voluntary Workers
Mary Florence Edith, Baroness Mostyn, Commandant and Donor, Mostyn Convalescent Home, Holywell, Flint
Annie Bertha Mudie, Queen Mary's Needlework Guild
Catherine Miller-Mundy, Vice-President, Ilkeston Division, Derbyshire Branch, British Red Cross Society
Archibald Murchie, Superintending Accountant for France, Y.M.C.A. 
Ivor Percy Nicholson, Officer in Charge of Periodicals, Ministry of Information
Henry Kingscote Nisbet, General Inspector, Local Government Board
Captain Lionel Edward Close Norbury  Surgeon, British Red Cross Hospital, Netley
Percy George Norman, Headquarters Accountant, Y.M.C.A. 
Walter Arthur Northam, General Manager, Cinematograph Department, Ministry of Information
May Nuttall, Vice-President, Oldham Division, East Lancashire Branch, British Red Cross Society
Beatrice Jane O'Brien, Head of the Sphagnum Moss Branch, Irish Women's Hospital Supply Depot
James Rodney O'Donnell, Assistant Secretary to Irish Food Control Committee
Arthur Maule Oliver, Town Clerk, Newcastle upon Tyne; Honorary Executive Officer, Newcastle Food Control Committee; Chief Executive Officer, Tyneside Advisory Food Committee
Herbert Charles O'Neill, Officer-in-charge of Scandinavian Section, Ministry of Information
Harriet Katharine Onslow, Royal Naval Division Comforts Fund
Eugénie Josephine Oudin  Private Secretary to Adjutant-General
Captain Walter Benjamin Palmer, Master of the Transport Kaiser-I-Hind
George Pate, Managing Director, The Carron Company; Member, Edinburgh Munitions Board  of Management
Engineer Commander George Patterson  Chief Engineer of the Transport Aquitania
William Francis Paul  Donor and Organiser, Broadwater Auxiliary Hospital
Charles Child Pearson, British Ministry of Food in U.S.A.
Margaret Catharine Peck, Borough of Folkestone Voluntary Workers' Association
The Reverend Howard Nasmith Perrin, Donor and Administrator, Runcorn Auxiliary Hospital
William Littlejohn Phillip  Joint Managing Director, Messrs. Spencer & Company Limited
John Robert Phillips, Examiner, Accountant-General's Department, Post Office
Major Samuel Renny Pinkney  Assistant Director, Ship Purchase Section, Ministry of Shipping
The Honourable Mary Olivia de la Poer, Organiser, Tipperary War Hospital Supply Depot, British Red Cross Society
Margaret Joyce Powell, Secretary to Dentral Agricultural Advisory Council
Lady Beatrice Adina Pretyman, Donor, Orwell Park Auxiliary Hospital
John Quayle, Chief Engineer, Mercantile Marine
Ernest Barkley Raikes, County Secretary, Norfolk Branch, British Red Cross Society 
John Maclean Ramsay, Superintendent of Statistics, Board of Agriculture for Scotland
Alexander Oliver Rankine  Chief Research Assistant, Admiralty Experimental Station, Harwich
Ralph George Joynson Rawlinson  Divisional Commander, Metropolitan Special Constabulary
Harry Thomas Reading, District Superintendent, Trinity House, Yarmouth
Major David Valentine Rees  Operating Surgeon, Brecon and Builth Auxiliary Hospitals
Joseph Cook Rees, Commandant of Transport, Neath District, British Red Cross Society
Charles Reid  Deputy County Director, Staffordshire Branch, British Red Cross Society
Katherine Alice Ricardo, Joint Commandant, Christchurch Auxiliary Hospital
Fabian Arthur Besant Rice, Executive Officer, Brighton Food Control Committee
Harry Richardson, Executive Officer, Birmingham Food Control Committee
Arthur Henry Riseley   Secretary, Ministry of National Service, South Western Region 
Edith Mary Roads, Controller of Typists, War Office
John McLorinan Robb, Superintending Engineer-in-Charge of South Midland District, General Post Office
Edward Coleridge Roberts  Senior Medical Officer, Grovelands Auxiliary Hospital, Southgate, Middlesex
Katharine Haigh Robinson, Commandant, University Auxiliary Hospital, Oxford
Thomas Robinson  Bradford Dyers' Association
John Henry Rogers, Honorary Secretary and Treasurer, Birmingham Joint Voluntary Aid Detachment, Committee, British Red Cross Society
Ambrose Rollin, Cashier, H.M. Dockyard, Devonport
Frederick Alexander Ross, Manager, Messrs. Morgan Grenfell and Company
Bessie Rose Row, General Service Superintendent, Devonshire Branch, British Red Cross Society
Clementina Elizabeth Hope Rowcliffe, Vice-President, Cranleigh Division, Surrey Branch, British Red Cross Society; Commandant of Oaklands Auxiliary Hospital
Henry Snowden Rowell, Deputy Director, Department of Deputy Controller of Armament Production, Admiralty
Anne Emily, Dowager Duchess of Roxburghe, President, Haddingtonshire Branch, Scottish Branch, British Red Cross Society
The Honourable Eustace Scott Hamilton-Russell, Commandant, Brancepeth Castle Auxiliary Hospital, Durham
Herbert Ryle, Assistant Architect, First Class, H.M. Office of Works
Stella Fanny Safford, Lady Superintendent, H.R.H. Princess Victoria's Rest Club, Camiers
The Honourable Lockhart Matthew St. Clair  Divisional Commander, Metropolitan Special Constabulary
David Alexander Stewart Sandeman, Ministry of Munitions
Eleanor Mary Caroline, Viscountess Sandhurst
George William Saunders  Commercial Assistant, Requisition Branch, Ministry of Shipping
Joseph Sayers, Superintendent at one of H.M. Factories, Ministry of Munitions
William Farrar Scholfield, Acting Principal Clerk, H.M. Office of Works
Adam Scott, District Secretary, Y.M.C.A., Étaples
John Bridson Seatie, War Office
Prideaux George Selby  Medical Officer, Auxiliary Hospital, Sittingbourne, Kent
Julia Perronet Sells, Queen Mary's Needlework Guild
William Fry Shannon, Second Assistant Director of Finance, Ministry of Pensions
George Ernest Shaw, Civil Assistant, Directorate of Prisoners of War, War Office
Gwendoline Mary Shaw, Honorary Secretary, Mayoress's War Hospital Supply Depot, Ipswich
Walter Henry Shepperd, Acting Paymaster, Army Pay Department
Violet Mary Siltzer, Stores Department, Headquarters Staff, British Red Cross Society
Captain James Sim, Master of the Ambulance Transport Warilda
Captain Stanley Hall Simmons, Master of the Transport Chagres
Richard Arbuthnot Samson  Divisional Commander, Metropolitan Special Constabulary
James Edward Singleton, Sub-Inspector, Board of Education; Honorary Secretary, Cumberland County Committee for War Savings
Percy Henry Smart Sitters, District Secretary, Y.M.C.A., Calais-Dunkirk Area
James Buteux Skeggs, Town Clerk, Poplar; Clerk to the Local Tribunal and Honorary Secretary to the Local Representative Committee
James Cameron Smail  Organiser of Trade Schools under the Education Committee of the London County Council; District Manager, Metropolitan Munitions Committee
Elsie Mary Small, Commandant, Southwell Auxiliary Hospital; Nottinghamshire
Frances Mary Smith, Commandant, Billingboro Auxiliary Hospital, South Lincolnshire
Captain Frederick Crawford Smith, Officer-in-Charge, Base Ambulance Convoys, British Red Cross Society, Boulogne
Marshall Bang Smith, Trinity House
Sarah Helen Smith, Commandant, Priory Auxiliary Hospital, Cheltenham
Thomas Smith 
Wilfrid Guy Spear  Acting Superintending Clerk, Accountant General's Department, Admiralty
William Blatspiel Stamp, Divisional Commander, City of London Police Special Reserve
James Stark  Cupar and District Voluntary Workers' Association
Isabel Margaret Stedman, Assistant, French Section, Ministry of Information
Philippa Anna Frederica Stephenson, Essex Regiment Prisoners of War Fund
Alexandrina Ryrie Steward, Wiltshire Prisoners of War Committee
John Stewart, Executive Officer, City of Edinburgh Food Control Committee
John Northover Stickland, Late Superintending Inspector, Customs and Excise
George Robert Fabris Stilwell  Medical Officer, Balgowan Auxiliary Hospital, Beckenham, Kent
Major Arthur Perry Stockings, Director, British Red Cross Stores, Genoa, Italy
Andrew Denys Stocks, Clerk, Procurator-General's Department
Irene Mary Stokes, Honorary Secretary, County and City of Dublin Division, Soldiers' and Sailor's Families Association
John Edward Kynaston Studd, President, Regent Street Polytechnic
Captain Montagu Wemyss Suart  Divisional Commander, Metropolitan Special Constabulary
Albert James Sylvester  Private Secretary to the Secretary to the War Cabinet
Alexander Thomson Taylor, Chairman, Renfrew Local Food Control Committee
William Taylor, Chairman and Managing Director, Messrs. Taylor, Taylor and Hobson, Limited
Lilian Eugenia Tench, The Sailors' and Soldiers' Club, Rome
Thomas William Thirlwell, Personnel Secretary, Church Army Huts and Centres
Richard Thirsk, His Britannic Majesty's Consul, Aarhus
Ivor Craddock Thomas  Section Director, Priority Department, Ministry of Munitions
Maude Tuson Thomas, Commandant, Brondesbury Park Auxiliary Hospital
George Roger Thompson, Chief Engineer of the Transport Toronto
Thomas Marson Till, Deputy Controller, Finance Department, Ministry of Information
Douglas Theodore Timins, Secretary, Munitions War Savings Advisory Committee
Robert Tinniswood, Assistant Director of Finance, Ministry of Pensions
Cyprienne Emma Madeleine Hanbury-Tracy, Worker in Canteens and Clubs for British and Italian Troops in Italy
Captain Alfred William Vincent Trant, Marine Superintendent, Mercantile Movements Division, Admiralty
The Honourable Ellinor Trotter, Stores Department, Headquarters Staff, British Red Cross Society
Lucinda Elizabeth Alexandra Tubbs, Commandant, Albion House Auxiliary Hospital, Newbury, Berkshire
George Turner  Chairman, Cambridge Local Tribunal
Samuel Thomas Turner, Inspector of Munitions Areas, Sheffield
William Ernest Stephen Turner  Secretary, Society of Glass Technology; Head of Department of Glass Technology at Sheffield University
Helena Augusta Mary Turpin, Voluntary Worker, Hospital Bag Fund
John Urie, Section Director, Contracts Department, Ministry of Munitions
Janet Feliza Vaughan, Vice-President, Taunton District, Somersetshire Branch, British Red Cross Society, and Organiser of Priory Schools Auxiliary Hospital, Taunton
Caroline Emily Venables, Commandant, Highland Moors Auxiliary Hospital, Llandrindod Wells
Constance Waggett, Honorary Head Lady, Church Army Hut Workers in France
Richard Wake, Section Director, Small Arms and Machine Guns Department, Ministry of Munitions
Roger Donald Waters, Assistant Director of Inland Construction, Department of the Administrator of Works and Buildings, Air Ministry
William Edward Watkins, Secretary to the Education Committee of the Local Education Authority, County Council of East Suffolk
Dorothy Bannerman Watson, District Secretary, British Red Cross Society, and Commandant, Clifford Street Auxiliary Hospital, York
Major Douglas Home Watson, Regional Recorder, Ministry of National Service, London and South-Eastern Region
Edith Deverell Watson, Lady Superintendent, H.R.H. Princess Victoria's Club for Nurses, Wirnereux
Lieutenant-Colonel Myers Wayman, District Director, Appointments Department, Ministry of Labour
George Webster, Late Secretary, now Member, Rochdale Munitions Board of Management
George Coulson Welborn, Official Ore Broker, Commercial Branchy, Ministry of Shipping
James Laurence Wells, Orgauising Secretary for War Savings, Glasgow
Florence Ffaith Hastings-Wheler, Donor and Commandant, Ledston Hall Auxiliary Hospital, Castleford, Yorkshire
Annie Whiller, Salvation Army
Beatrice Whitbread, Wounded and Missing Enquiry Department, British Red Cross Society
George Whittaker
William de Burgh Whyte, Deputy Director of Production, British War Mission in U.S.A.
William Edward Whyte, Clerk to the Middle Ward District Committee, Hamilton
Captain John Wilkins, Master, Mercantile Marine
Charles Williams, Late Honorary Secretary and Chief Executive Officer, Northumberland War Agricultural Executive Committee
Harris Gregory Williams, Assistant to General Manager, Messrs. Armstrong and Company, Newcastle
William Nance Williams, Technical Adviser on Wages, Labour Regulation Department, Ministry of Munitions
Lieutenant-Colonel Michael Williamson, Area Recruiting Organiser in Ireland
Edith Wilmot, Assistant County Director, Devonshire Branch, British Red Cross Society
Charlotte Mary Wilson, Oxford and Bucks Prisoners of War Fund
David Wilson, General Distribution Branch, Coal Mines Department, Board of Trade
Helena Jane Wilson, Commandant, Chippenham Auxiliary Hospital, Wiltshire
Captain Henry Adrian Fitzroy Wilson, Secretary and Registrar, British Red Cross- Hospital, Netley
Richard William Wilson, Chief Secretary, Salvation Army's Work amongst the Troops in the United Kingdom
Agnes Rankine Winram, Honorary Secretary Fund for British' Soldiers interned in Germany
George Mitchell Winter  Chairman, Torquay Food Control Committee
Evelyn Emma Amelia Wren, Late Vice-President, Lexden-Winstree Division, Essex Branch, British Red Cross Society
John Brown Wright, Deputy Director of Cheese Supplies, Ministry of Food
The Reverend Basil Alfred Yeaxlee, Secretary, Universities Committee, Y.M.C.A.

British India
John Harold Abbott, Jhansi, United Provinces
H.H Dr. Rai Rajeshwar Bali Taluqdar - Rampur Dariyabad, Honorary Magistrate, Barabanki, Minister of Education & Health United Provinces
Frederick Henry Addis  Carriage and Wagon Superintendent, Bombay, Baroda and Central India Railway
Captain Alfred Stevenson Balfour, Royal Indian Marine, aide-de-camp to Governor of Madras
The Reverend Major George Dunsford Barne, Principal; Lawrence Military Asylum, Sanawar
Arthur Morton Bell, Carriage and Wagon Superintendent, Great Indian Peninsular Railway
James William Best, Deputy Conservator of Forests, Hoshangabad, Central Provinces
Clement Ayerst Beyts, Indian Civil Service, Collector, Ahmednagar, Bombay
Mabel, Lady Bingley, Member of the Council of the Simla-Delhi Red Cross Work Party
The Reverend James Black, Chaplain, St. Andrew's Kirk, Simla, Punjab
George Blackstock, Managing Director, Messrs. Rowe & Co, Burma
Harold Branford, Manager, Carpet Factory, Mirzapur, United Provinces
Major Philip William Lilian Broke-Smith  Royal Engineers, officiating A.C.R.E., Peshawar, North-West Frontier Province
Arthur Cecil Brown, Agent, Bank of Bengal, Dacca
John Arthur Evans Burrup  Customs Department, Calcutta
Rao Bahadur Choudhri Lai Chand, Pleader, Rohtak, Punjab
Rai Bahadur Lala Karam Chanel  Banker, Peshawar
Alfred James Chase, Locomotive Superintendent, North-Western Railway
Major Richard Henry Chenevix-Trench, First Assistant to Agent to the Governor-General, Baluchistan
Marmaduke Robert Coburn, Deputy Controller, War Accounts
Lieutenant Godfrey Ferdinando Stratford Collins, Indian Army Reserve of Officers, Recruiting Officer, Kirkee, Bombay
Thomas Fothergill Cooke, Superintendent of Police, Hissar, Punjab
Robert Mansneld Cowley  Traffic Manager, East Indian Railway
Maud Lilian Davys, Laboratory Assistant, Kasauli, Punjab
Rani Chandelin Ju Deo, Rampura, United Provinces
Lieutenant-Commander Henry Aloysius Bruno Digby-Beste, Royal Indian Marine
John Collard Bernard Drake, Indian Civil Service, Magistrate and Deputy Collector, Ranchi, Bihar and Orissa
Kate Hannah Ellis, Madras
Aline Elwes, Honorary Work Secretary of Ladies' Depot of Madras War Fund, Madras
Lieutenant Keith Grahame Feiling, Royal Scots Fusiliers, Secretary, Central Recruiting Board
Second Lieutenant John Alexander Ferguson, Indian Civil Service, Registrar, Chief Court, Punjab
Major Michael Lloyd Ferrar, Indian Army, Postal Censor, Bombay
Robert Loraine Gamlen, Master of His Exalted Highness the Nizam's Mint, Hyderabad
James Ainsworth Gilbert, Bank of Bengal, Calcutta
Marie Girard, Bengal
Engineer Lieutenant-Commander James William Mineard Godden, Royal Indian Marine, Engineer in Charge of Factory, Bombay Dockyard
Mary Hannyngton, Indian Soldiers' Fund
Major Thomas Guy Marriott Harris, Indian Army, Political Department, Assistant Political Agent, Kalat, Baluchistan
Robert Hemiss Handasyd Hopkins, Shipping Master, Bombay
William Stenning Hopkyns, Indian Civil Service, Magistrate and Collector, Mymensingh, Bengal
Lieutenant-Colonel Francis Dillon Hunt, Army Veterinary Corps, Ahmednagar, Bombay
Khan Bahadur Muhammad Aziz-ud-Din Husain  Madras
Shaikh Shahid Husain, Barrister-at-Law, Lucknow, United Provinces
Sidney John Kendrick, Superintendent, Carriage and Wagon Department, East Indian Railway
Khan Bahadar Nawao Muhammad Muzammilullah Khan, Bhikampur, United Provinces
Khan Bahadur Arbab Dost Muhammad Khan  Takkal Bala, North-West Frontier Province
Khan Bahadur Malik Muhammad Amin Khan, Shamshabad, Punjab
Commander George Henry Stransham La Touche, Royal Indian Marine, Deputy Port Officer, Calcutta
Maxwell Study Leigh, Indian Civil Service, Sub-Divisional Officer, Khushab, Punjab
Thomas Henry LeMesurier, Secretary, South Indian Railway
William James Litster, Alliance Bank, Simla
Major Edward Campbell Loch, Indian Army, Remount Department, Calcutta
Major Hugh Arthur Lomas, Indian Civil Service, Deputy Commissioner, Almora, United Provinces
Ethel Luxmore, Secretary, Women's War Work Bureau, Delhi
Vivian Hardy MacCaw, Kettlewell, Bullen & Co., Calcutta
Dorothy Maffey, Secretary, Simla-Delhi Red Cross Work Party
Abdul Majid, Deputy Superintendent of Police, Central Intelligence Department
Khan Bahadur Ardeshir Dossabhoy Marker, Baluchistan
Frederick Barclay Martin, Superintendent, Kalabagh-Bannu section, North-Western Railway
Adeline Mason, Cachar, Assam
The Reverend James Mathers, Provincial Army Secretary for South India Young Men's Christian Association, Bangalore
John Fisher McMichael, District Traffic Superintendent, North-Western Railway
Arthur Wyndham McNair, Indian Civil Service, Magistrate and Collector, United Provinces
John James Meikle, Superintendent, Government Printing, Calcutta
Lieutenant-Colonel Hugh Henry Gordon Mitchell, Madras Group, Garrison Artillery
Captain Wigram Seymour Elliot Money, 22nd Sam Browne's Cavalry; Military Secretary to His Excellency the Governor of Madras
Captain Claude Emanuel Montefiore, Indian Army, Assam Military Police
Arthur Mort, Mining Manager, Khost Colliery, Baluchistan
Horace Charles Mules  Chairman, Port Trust, Karachi
Charles Allan Mumford, Indian Civil Service, Magistrate and Collector, Bulandshahr, United Provinces
Arthur Edward Nelson, Indian Civil Service, Commissioner of Excise, Central Provinces
Ralph Oakden, Indian Civil Service, Magistrate and Collector, Aligarh, United Provinces
Frederick James Page, Locomotive and Carriage Superintendent, Bombay, Baroda and Central India Railway
Commander Herbert John Paterson, Royal Naval Reserve (retired)
John Powell, Honorary Magistrate, Rawalpindi Punjab
Campbell Ward Rhodes, Vice-Consul, Argentine Republic, Calcutta
Horace Astell Lynn Robinson, Eastern Telegraph Company
Alexander Rodger, Imperial Forest Service, Burma (Indian Munitions Board)
Jotindra Nath Roy, Press Censor, Bengal
George Drury Rudkin, Indian Civil Service, Revenue and Finance Member, Bikaner, Rajputana
Honorary Second Lieutenant Raja Lokendra Sah, Jagamanpur, United Provinces
Charles Edward Walker Sands, Superintendent of Police, Bareilly, United Provinces
Ernest Alexander Scott, Signal Engineer, North-Western Railway, Lahore, Punjab
Khan Bahadur Sayyid Mahdi Shah, Gojra, Punjab
Robert Melvin Shelton, Chief Secretary, Young Men's Christian Association, Overseas, Bengal
Colin Joseph Silvester, Inspector of Munitions, Calcutta
Helen Simkins, Sibsagar, Assam
Rai Bahadur Bhaiya Ganga Baksh Singh, Honorary Magistrate, Balrampur, United Provinces
Sardar Bahadur Gajjan Singh, Pleader, Ludhiana, Punjab
Raja Parbal Partab Singh, Honorary Magistrate, Eta, wah, United Provinces
James Algernon Stevens, Chief Collector of Customs, Burma
Helen Osmer Stewart, War Depot, Calcutta
Alexander Montagu Stow, Indian Civil Service, Settlement Officer, Jammu and Kashmir State
Clare Street, Bombay 
Ethel Swaine, Secretary, Ranchi Ladies' Committee of Joint Red Cross and St. John Ambulance Association, Bihar and Orissa
Rudolph Victor Symons, District Engineer, Great Indian Peninsula Railway, Bombay
Maung Po Tha, Head Broker, Messrs. Steel Bros., Burma
Edgar Thompson, Indian Telegraph Department
Lieutenant-Colonel Frank Stuart Corbitt Thompson  Indian Medical Service, Superintendent, Presidency Jail, Bengal
Reginald Todd, Agent, Madras and Southern Mahratta Railway
Alice Todhunter, Ladies' Department, Madras War Fund, Madras
John Walker Tomb, Chief Sanitary Officer, Asansol Mines Board of Health, Bengal
Digby Bruce Trevor, Officiating Traffic Manager, North-Western Railway, Lahore
Lim Chin Tsong, Merchant, Burma
Commissary and Honorary Major James Wilson Turner, Inspector of Explosives with the Government of India
Georgina Jean Elizabeth Ure, in charge of Rangoon Department of Comforts for Troops, Burma
Charles Archibald Walpole, Manager, Anglo-Persian Oil Company, Mohammerah, Persian Gulf
The Reverend Garfield Williams, Editor, War Journal, United Provinces
Geoffrey Worsley, Indian Civil Service, Political Assistant and Commandant, B.M.P., Dera Ghazi Khan, Punjab

Egypt
George Davis Hornblower, Chief Inspector, Public Security
Major Chudleigh Garvice  Commandant of Police, Alexandria
Frank Cole Madden  Senior Surgeon, Kasr-el-Ainy Hospital
John Archibald Scott, of Messrs. Richmond, Scott & Co., Alexandria
Robert Rolo, Banker, Cairo

Sudan
Major Mervyn James Wheatley, Private Secretary to the Sirdar and Governor-General
Robert Hewison, Assistant Director of Agriculture
Arthur James Croft Huddleston, Sudan Civil Service
Temporary Captain Charles Armine Willis, Assistant Director, Intelligence Department

Honorary Officers
Hassan Hassib Pasha, Governor of Gharbia Province
Ali Gemal El Din Pasha, Governor of Menufia Province
Ibrahim Halim Pasha, Governor of Beheira Province

References

New Year Honours
1919 awards
1919 in Australia
1919 in Canada
1919 in India
1919 in New Zealand
1919 in the United Kingdom